

144001–144100 

|-bgcolor=#fefefe
| 144001 ||  || — || January 13, 2004 || Anderson Mesa || LONEOS || FLO || align=right data-sort-value="0.98" | 980 m || 
|-id=002 bgcolor=#fefefe
| 144002 ||  || — || January 13, 2004 || Anderson Mesa || LONEOS || — || align=right | 2.0 km || 
|-id=003 bgcolor=#E9E9E9
| 144003 ||  || — || January 15, 2004 || Kitt Peak || Spacewatch || — || align=right | 3.1 km || 
|-id=004 bgcolor=#fefefe
| 144004 ||  || — || January 13, 2004 || Anderson Mesa || LONEOS || FLO || align=right | 1.1 km || 
|-id=005 bgcolor=#fefefe
| 144005 ||  || — || January 13, 2004 || Palomar || NEAT || NYS || align=right | 1.2 km || 
|-id=006 bgcolor=#E9E9E9
| 144006 ||  || — || January 14, 2004 || Palomar || NEAT || — || align=right | 1.9 km || 
|-id=007 bgcolor=#E9E9E9
| 144007 ||  || — || January 14, 2004 || Palomar || NEAT || AER || align=right | 5.5 km || 
|-id=008 bgcolor=#fefefe
| 144008 ||  || — || January 15, 2004 || Kitt Peak || Spacewatch || — || align=right | 1.3 km || 
|-id=009 bgcolor=#E9E9E9
| 144009 ||  || — || January 13, 2004 || Anderson Mesa || LONEOS || — || align=right | 2.2 km || 
|-id=010 bgcolor=#E9E9E9
| 144010 ||  || — || January 15, 2004 || Kitt Peak || Spacewatch || — || align=right | 2.5 km || 
|-id=011 bgcolor=#fefefe
| 144011 ||  || — || January 16, 2004 || Palomar || NEAT || NYS || align=right data-sort-value="0.77" | 770 m || 
|-id=012 bgcolor=#fefefe
| 144012 ||  || — || January 16, 2004 || Palomar || NEAT || V || align=right | 1.5 km || 
|-id=013 bgcolor=#E9E9E9
| 144013 ||  || — || January 16, 2004 || Palomar || NEAT || — || align=right | 2.5 km || 
|-id=014 bgcolor=#fefefe
| 144014 ||  || — || January 16, 2004 || Palomar || NEAT || MAS || align=right | 1.3 km || 
|-id=015 bgcolor=#E9E9E9
| 144015 ||  || — || January 16, 2004 || Kitt Peak || Spacewatch || HEN || align=right | 1.5 km || 
|-id=016 bgcolor=#fefefe
| 144016 ||  || — || January 17, 2004 || Kitt Peak || Spacewatch || — || align=right | 1.3 km || 
|-id=017 bgcolor=#fefefe
| 144017 ||  || — || January 16, 2004 || Palomar || NEAT || MAS || align=right | 1.4 km || 
|-id=018 bgcolor=#E9E9E9
| 144018 ||  || — || January 17, 2004 || Haleakala || NEAT || — || align=right | 5.1 km || 
|-id=019 bgcolor=#fefefe
| 144019 ||  || — || January 17, 2004 || Palomar || NEAT || — || align=right | 1.2 km || 
|-id=020 bgcolor=#d6d6d6
| 144020 ||  || — || January 17, 2004 || Palomar || NEAT || — || align=right | 3.8 km || 
|-id=021 bgcolor=#fefefe
| 144021 ||  || — || January 17, 2004 || Palomar || NEAT || — || align=right | 1.4 km || 
|-id=022 bgcolor=#fefefe
| 144022 ||  || — || January 17, 2004 || Palomar || NEAT || — || align=right | 1.1 km || 
|-id=023 bgcolor=#fefefe
| 144023 ||  || — || January 17, 2004 || Palomar || NEAT || — || align=right | 1.0 km || 
|-id=024 bgcolor=#E9E9E9
| 144024 ||  || — || January 17, 2004 || Palomar || NEAT || — || align=right | 2.2 km || 
|-id=025 bgcolor=#E9E9E9
| 144025 ||  || — || January 16, 2004 || Kitt Peak || Spacewatch || — || align=right | 1.7 km || 
|-id=026 bgcolor=#fefefe
| 144026 ||  || — || January 17, 2004 || Kitt Peak || Spacewatch || NYS || align=right | 1.3 km || 
|-id=027 bgcolor=#E9E9E9
| 144027 ||  || — || January 16, 2004 || Palomar || NEAT || — || align=right | 3.3 km || 
|-id=028 bgcolor=#fefefe
| 144028 ||  || — || January 19, 2004 || Socorro || LINEAR || — || align=right | 2.4 km || 
|-id=029 bgcolor=#E9E9E9
| 144029 ||  || — || January 16, 2004 || Catalina || CSS || — || align=right | 2.0 km || 
|-id=030 bgcolor=#fefefe
| 144030 ||  || — || January 16, 2004 || Catalina || CSS || V || align=right | 1.0 km || 
|-id=031 bgcolor=#fefefe
| 144031 ||  || — || January 16, 2004 || Kitt Peak || Spacewatch || — || align=right | 1.2 km || 
|-id=032 bgcolor=#fefefe
| 144032 ||  || — || January 17, 2004 || Palomar || NEAT || — || align=right | 1.6 km || 
|-id=033 bgcolor=#fefefe
| 144033 ||  || — || January 17, 2004 || Palomar || NEAT || V || align=right | 1.3 km || 
|-id=034 bgcolor=#E9E9E9
| 144034 ||  || — || January 18, 2004 || Palomar || NEAT || AER || align=right | 2.0 km || 
|-id=035 bgcolor=#fefefe
| 144035 ||  || — || January 19, 2004 || Anderson Mesa || LONEOS || — || align=right | 1.3 km || 
|-id=036 bgcolor=#E9E9E9
| 144036 ||  || — || January 19, 2004 || Anderson Mesa || LONEOS || — || align=right | 1.8 km || 
|-id=037 bgcolor=#fefefe
| 144037 ||  || — || January 19, 2004 || Anderson Mesa || LONEOS || — || align=right | 1.2 km || 
|-id=038 bgcolor=#fefefe
| 144038 ||  || — || January 19, 2004 || Kitt Peak || Spacewatch || MAS || align=right | 1.1 km || 
|-id=039 bgcolor=#fefefe
| 144039 ||  || — || January 19, 2004 || Catalina || CSS || NYSfast || align=right | 1.2 km || 
|-id=040 bgcolor=#E9E9E9
| 144040 ||  || — || January 19, 2004 || Kitt Peak || Spacewatch || HEN || align=right | 1.5 km || 
|-id=041 bgcolor=#E9E9E9
| 144041 ||  || — || January 21, 2004 || Socorro || LINEAR || — || align=right | 2.1 km || 
|-id=042 bgcolor=#fefefe
| 144042 ||  || — || January 21, 2004 || Socorro || LINEAR || — || align=right | 1.0 km || 
|-id=043 bgcolor=#fefefe
| 144043 ||  || — || January 16, 2004 || Kitt Peak || Spacewatch || FLO || align=right | 1.0 km || 
|-id=044 bgcolor=#fefefe
| 144044 ||  || — || January 21, 2004 || Socorro || LINEAR || — || align=right | 1.6 km || 
|-id=045 bgcolor=#E9E9E9
| 144045 ||  || — || January 19, 2004 || Socorro || LINEAR || — || align=right | 2.1 km || 
|-id=046 bgcolor=#fefefe
| 144046 ||  || — || January 18, 2004 || Palomar || NEAT || MAS || align=right | 1.6 km || 
|-id=047 bgcolor=#fefefe
| 144047 ||  || — || January 18, 2004 || Palomar || NEAT || NYS || align=right | 1.4 km || 
|-id=048 bgcolor=#E9E9E9
| 144048 ||  || — || January 18, 2004 || Palomar || NEAT || — || align=right | 5.1 km || 
|-id=049 bgcolor=#E9E9E9
| 144049 ||  || — || January 18, 2004 || Palomar || NEAT || — || align=right | 2.9 km || 
|-id=050 bgcolor=#fefefe
| 144050 ||  || — || January 18, 2004 || Palomar || NEAT || NYS || align=right | 1.0 km || 
|-id=051 bgcolor=#E9E9E9
| 144051 ||  || — || January 18, 2004 || Palomar || NEAT || — || align=right | 2.4 km || 
|-id=052 bgcolor=#fefefe
| 144052 ||  || — || January 18, 2004 || Palomar || NEAT || NYS || align=right | 1.3 km || 
|-id=053 bgcolor=#d6d6d6
| 144053 ||  || — || January 18, 2004 || Palomar || NEAT || — || align=right | 4.0 km || 
|-id=054 bgcolor=#fefefe
| 144054 ||  || — || January 19, 2004 || Catalina || CSS || — || align=right | 1.7 km || 
|-id=055 bgcolor=#fefefe
| 144055 ||  || — || January 19, 2004 || Kitt Peak || Spacewatch || NYS || align=right | 1.0 km || 
|-id=056 bgcolor=#fefefe
| 144056 ||  || — || January 19, 2004 || Kitt Peak || Spacewatch || NYS || align=right | 1.0 km || 
|-id=057 bgcolor=#fefefe
| 144057 ||  || — || January 19, 2004 || Kitt Peak || Spacewatch || NYS || align=right | 1.4 km || 
|-id=058 bgcolor=#E9E9E9
| 144058 ||  || — || January 19, 2004 || Catalina || CSS || — || align=right | 3.2 km || 
|-id=059 bgcolor=#fefefe
| 144059 ||  || — || January 21, 2004 || Socorro || LINEAR || — || align=right | 1.3 km || 
|-id=060 bgcolor=#E9E9E9
| 144060 ||  || — || January 19, 2004 || Socorro || LINEAR || — || align=right | 4.9 km || 
|-id=061 bgcolor=#fefefe
| 144061 ||  || — || January 19, 2004 || Catalina || CSS || — || align=right | 1.4 km || 
|-id=062 bgcolor=#fefefe
| 144062 ||  || — || January 19, 2004 || Catalina || CSS || NYS || align=right | 1.0 km || 
|-id=063 bgcolor=#fefefe
| 144063 ||  || — || January 19, 2004 || Catalina || CSS || NYS || align=right | 1.2 km || 
|-id=064 bgcolor=#fefefe
| 144064 ||  || — || January 22, 2004 || Socorro || LINEAR || NYS || align=right | 1.0 km || 
|-id=065 bgcolor=#fefefe
| 144065 ||  || — || January 22, 2004 || Socorro || LINEAR || — || align=right | 1.4 km || 
|-id=066 bgcolor=#fefefe
| 144066 ||  || — || January 22, 2004 || Socorro || LINEAR || NYS || align=right | 1.5 km || 
|-id=067 bgcolor=#fefefe
| 144067 ||  || — || January 22, 2004 || Palomar || NEAT || V || align=right | 1.3 km || 
|-id=068 bgcolor=#fefefe
| 144068 ||  || — || January 21, 2004 || Socorro || LINEAR || ERI || align=right | 3.5 km || 
|-id=069 bgcolor=#fefefe
| 144069 ||  || — || January 21, 2004 || Socorro || LINEAR || — || align=right | 1.8 km || 
|-id=070 bgcolor=#fefefe
| 144070 ||  || — || January 21, 2004 || Socorro || LINEAR || V || align=right | 1.2 km || 
|-id=071 bgcolor=#fefefe
| 144071 ||  || — || January 21, 2004 || Socorro || LINEAR || — || align=right | 3.3 km || 
|-id=072 bgcolor=#E9E9E9
| 144072 ||  || — || January 21, 2004 || Socorro || LINEAR || — || align=right | 3.4 km || 
|-id=073 bgcolor=#fefefe
| 144073 ||  || — || January 21, 2004 || Socorro || LINEAR || — || align=right | 1.3 km || 
|-id=074 bgcolor=#E9E9E9
| 144074 ||  || — || January 21, 2004 || Socorro || LINEAR || — || align=right | 1.4 km || 
|-id=075 bgcolor=#fefefe
| 144075 ||  || — || January 21, 2004 || Socorro || LINEAR || — || align=right | 1.5 km || 
|-id=076 bgcolor=#fefefe
| 144076 ||  || — || January 21, 2004 || Socorro || LINEAR || FLO || align=right | 1.0 km || 
|-id=077 bgcolor=#E9E9E9
| 144077 ||  || — || January 21, 2004 || Socorro || LINEAR || — || align=right | 1.9 km || 
|-id=078 bgcolor=#fefefe
| 144078 ||  || — || January 21, 2004 || Socorro || LINEAR || — || align=right | 1.3 km || 
|-id=079 bgcolor=#E9E9E9
| 144079 ||  || — || January 21, 2004 || Socorro || LINEAR || MAR || align=right | 2.1 km || 
|-id=080 bgcolor=#E9E9E9
| 144080 ||  || — || January 21, 2004 || Socorro || LINEAR || — || align=right | 1.5 km || 
|-id=081 bgcolor=#fefefe
| 144081 ||  || — || January 21, 2004 || Socorro || LINEAR || NYS || align=right | 1.4 km || 
|-id=082 bgcolor=#d6d6d6
| 144082 ||  || — || January 21, 2004 || Socorro || LINEAR || — || align=right | 4.4 km || 
|-id=083 bgcolor=#fefefe
| 144083 ||  || — || January 21, 2004 || Socorro || LINEAR || NYS || align=right data-sort-value="0.93" | 930 m || 
|-id=084 bgcolor=#fefefe
| 144084 ||  || — || January 21, 2004 || Socorro || LINEAR || NYS || align=right | 1.00 km || 
|-id=085 bgcolor=#fefefe
| 144085 ||  || — || January 21, 2004 || Socorro || LINEAR || — || align=right | 1.1 km || 
|-id=086 bgcolor=#fefefe
| 144086 ||  || — || January 22, 2004 || Socorro || LINEAR || FLO || align=right | 1.0 km || 
|-id=087 bgcolor=#fefefe
| 144087 ||  || — || January 22, 2004 || Socorro || LINEAR || — || align=right | 1.6 km || 
|-id=088 bgcolor=#fefefe
| 144088 ||  || — || January 22, 2004 || Socorro || LINEAR || — || align=right | 1.2 km || 
|-id=089 bgcolor=#E9E9E9
| 144089 ||  || — || January 22, 2004 || Socorro || LINEAR || GEF || align=right | 2.6 km || 
|-id=090 bgcolor=#E9E9E9
| 144090 ||  || — || January 23, 2004 || Anderson Mesa || LONEOS || — || align=right | 2.3 km || 
|-id=091 bgcolor=#d6d6d6
| 144091 ||  || — || January 23, 2004 || Anderson Mesa || LONEOS || VER || align=right | 3.7 km || 
|-id=092 bgcolor=#fefefe
| 144092 ||  || — || January 23, 2004 || Socorro || LINEAR || — || align=right | 1.5 km || 
|-id=093 bgcolor=#fefefe
| 144093 ||  || — || January 23, 2004 || Socorro || LINEAR || MAS || align=right | 1.1 km || 
|-id=094 bgcolor=#fefefe
| 144094 ||  || — || January 23, 2004 || Socorro || LINEAR || — || align=right | 1.7 km || 
|-id=095 bgcolor=#fefefe
| 144095 ||  || — || January 23, 2004 || Socorro || LINEAR || — || align=right | 1.4 km || 
|-id=096 bgcolor=#fefefe
| 144096 Wiesendangen ||  ||  || January 23, 2004 || Winterthur || M. Griesser || — || align=right data-sort-value="0.95" | 950 m || 
|-id=097 bgcolor=#E9E9E9
| 144097 ||  || — || January 23, 2004 || Anderson Mesa || LONEOS || MAR || align=right | 2.1 km || 
|-id=098 bgcolor=#fefefe
| 144098 ||  || — || January 23, 2004 || Socorro || LINEAR || ERI || align=right | 3.4 km || 
|-id=099 bgcolor=#E9E9E9
| 144099 ||  || — || January 22, 2004 || Palomar || NEAT || — || align=right | 3.4 km || 
|-id=100 bgcolor=#fefefe
| 144100 ||  || — || January 22, 2004 || Socorro || LINEAR || — || align=right | 1.9 km || 
|}

144101–144200 

|-bgcolor=#E9E9E9
| 144101 ||  || — || January 22, 2004 || Socorro || LINEAR || MIS || align=right | 3.7 km || 
|-id=102 bgcolor=#fefefe
| 144102 ||  || — || January 22, 2004 || Socorro || LINEAR || V || align=right | 1.0 km || 
|-id=103 bgcolor=#fefefe
| 144103 ||  || — || January 27, 2004 || Socorro || LINEAR || PHO || align=right | 2.0 km || 
|-id=104 bgcolor=#E9E9E9
| 144104 ||  || — || January 27, 2004 || Goodricke-Pigott || R. A. Tucker || — || align=right | 3.6 km || 
|-id=105 bgcolor=#fefefe
| 144105 ||  || — || January 20, 2004 || Socorro || LINEAR || — || align=right | 1.4 km || 
|-id=106 bgcolor=#d6d6d6
| 144106 ||  || — || January 22, 2004 || Socorro || LINEAR || — || align=right | 3.8 km || 
|-id=107 bgcolor=#fefefe
| 144107 ||  || — || January 22, 2004 || Socorro || LINEAR || NYS || align=right | 1.2 km || 
|-id=108 bgcolor=#E9E9E9
| 144108 ||  || — || January 23, 2004 || Socorro || LINEAR || PAD || align=right | 2.5 km || 
|-id=109 bgcolor=#fefefe
| 144109 ||  || — || January 23, 2004 || Socorro || LINEAR || V || align=right | 1.3 km || 
|-id=110 bgcolor=#fefefe
| 144110 ||  || — || January 23, 2004 || Socorro || LINEAR || V || align=right | 1.9 km || 
|-id=111 bgcolor=#fefefe
| 144111 ||  || — || January 23, 2004 || Socorro || LINEAR || V || align=right | 1.3 km || 
|-id=112 bgcolor=#fefefe
| 144112 ||  || — || January 23, 2004 || Anderson Mesa || LONEOS || — || align=right | 1.6 km || 
|-id=113 bgcolor=#E9E9E9
| 144113 ||  || — || January 23, 2004 || Anderson Mesa || LONEOS || — || align=right | 2.1 km || 
|-id=114 bgcolor=#fefefe
| 144114 ||  || — || January 23, 2004 || Socorro || LINEAR || FLO || align=right | 1.4 km || 
|-id=115 bgcolor=#E9E9E9
| 144115 ||  || — || January 25, 2004 || Haleakala || NEAT || — || align=right | 2.1 km || 
|-id=116 bgcolor=#fefefe
| 144116 ||  || — || January 21, 2004 || Socorro || LINEAR || — || align=right | 1.5 km || 
|-id=117 bgcolor=#fefefe
| 144117 ||  || — || January 23, 2004 || Socorro || LINEAR || V || align=right | 1.3 km || 
|-id=118 bgcolor=#fefefe
| 144118 ||  || — || January 26, 2004 || Anderson Mesa || LONEOS || V || align=right | 1.3 km || 
|-id=119 bgcolor=#E9E9E9
| 144119 ||  || — || January 27, 2004 || Kitt Peak || Spacewatch || HOF || align=right | 3.3 km || 
|-id=120 bgcolor=#fefefe
| 144120 ||  || — || January 27, 2004 || Anderson Mesa || LONEOS || V || align=right | 1.2 km || 
|-id=121 bgcolor=#E9E9E9
| 144121 ||  || — || January 27, 2004 || Anderson Mesa || LONEOS || — || align=right | 2.8 km || 
|-id=122 bgcolor=#E9E9E9
| 144122 ||  || — || January 23, 2004 || Anderson Mesa || LONEOS || — || align=right | 2.7 km || 
|-id=123 bgcolor=#E9E9E9
| 144123 ||  || — || January 24, 2004 || Socorro || LINEAR || — || align=right | 2.5 km || 
|-id=124 bgcolor=#E9E9E9
| 144124 ||  || — || January 28, 2004 || Catalina || CSS || — || align=right | 2.9 km || 
|-id=125 bgcolor=#fefefe
| 144125 ||  || — || January 22, 2004 || Socorro || LINEAR || — || align=right | 1.2 km || 
|-id=126 bgcolor=#E9E9E9
| 144126 ||  || — || January 23, 2004 || Socorro || LINEAR || — || align=right | 4.1 km || 
|-id=127 bgcolor=#E9E9E9
| 144127 ||  || — || January 23, 2004 || Socorro || LINEAR || — || align=right | 3.8 km || 
|-id=128 bgcolor=#fefefe
| 144128 ||  || — || January 23, 2004 || Socorro || LINEAR || V || align=right | 1.2 km || 
|-id=129 bgcolor=#fefefe
| 144129 ||  || — || January 23, 2004 || Socorro || LINEAR || — || align=right | 1.5 km || 
|-id=130 bgcolor=#fefefe
| 144130 ||  || — || January 23, 2004 || Socorro || LINEAR || — || align=right | 1.5 km || 
|-id=131 bgcolor=#E9E9E9
| 144131 ||  || — || January 23, 2004 || Socorro || LINEAR || — || align=right | 4.1 km || 
|-id=132 bgcolor=#fefefe
| 144132 ||  || — || January 23, 2004 || Socorro || LINEAR || — || align=right | 1.3 km || 
|-id=133 bgcolor=#d6d6d6
| 144133 ||  || — || January 23, 2004 || Socorro || LINEAR || — || align=right | 3.6 km || 
|-id=134 bgcolor=#fefefe
| 144134 ||  || — || January 23, 2004 || Socorro || LINEAR || FLO || align=right data-sort-value="0.89" | 890 m || 
|-id=135 bgcolor=#fefefe
| 144135 ||  || — || January 23, 2004 || Socorro || LINEAR || — || align=right | 1.6 km || 
|-id=136 bgcolor=#fefefe
| 144136 ||  || — || January 24, 2004 || Socorro || LINEAR || MAS || align=right | 1.4 km || 
|-id=137 bgcolor=#E9E9E9
| 144137 ||  || — || January 24, 2004 || Socorro || LINEAR || — || align=right | 3.7 km || 
|-id=138 bgcolor=#E9E9E9
| 144138 ||  || — || January 24, 2004 || Socorro || LINEAR || — || align=right | 4.3 km || 
|-id=139 bgcolor=#fefefe
| 144139 ||  || — || January 24, 2004 || Socorro || LINEAR || — || align=right | 1.2 km || 
|-id=140 bgcolor=#fefefe
| 144140 ||  || — || January 26, 2004 || Anderson Mesa || LONEOS || — || align=right | 1.6 km || 
|-id=141 bgcolor=#E9E9E9
| 144141 ||  || — || January 27, 2004 || Anderson Mesa || LONEOS || RAF || align=right | 1.6 km || 
|-id=142 bgcolor=#fefefe
| 144142 ||  || — || January 27, 2004 || Anderson Mesa || LONEOS || — || align=right | 1.8 km || 
|-id=143 bgcolor=#d6d6d6
| 144143 ||  || — || January 27, 2004 || Anderson Mesa || LONEOS || — || align=right | 4.3 km || 
|-id=144 bgcolor=#fefefe
| 144144 ||  || — || January 27, 2004 || Catalina || CSS || — || align=right | 2.0 km || 
|-id=145 bgcolor=#fefefe
| 144145 ||  || — || January 28, 2004 || Socorro || LINEAR || — || align=right | 2.0 km || 
|-id=146 bgcolor=#fefefe
| 144146 ||  || — || January 28, 2004 || Socorro || LINEAR || — || align=right | 1.4 km || 
|-id=147 bgcolor=#d6d6d6
| 144147 ||  || — || January 28, 2004 || Haleakala || NEAT || — || align=right | 5.9 km || 
|-id=148 bgcolor=#E9E9E9
| 144148 ||  || — || January 28, 2004 || Socorro || LINEAR || MAR || align=right | 3.2 km || 
|-id=149 bgcolor=#E9E9E9
| 144149 ||  || — || January 28, 2004 || Socorro || LINEAR || — || align=right | 3.5 km || 
|-id=150 bgcolor=#fefefe
| 144150 ||  || — || January 16, 2004 || Palomar || NEAT || — || align=right | 1.5 km || 
|-id=151 bgcolor=#fefefe
| 144151 ||  || — || January 24, 2004 || Socorro || LINEAR || — || align=right | 1.2 km || 
|-id=152 bgcolor=#fefefe
| 144152 ||  || — || January 24, 2004 || Socorro || LINEAR || V || align=right | 1.2 km || 
|-id=153 bgcolor=#fefefe
| 144153 ||  || — || January 26, 2004 || Anderson Mesa || LONEOS || — || align=right | 1.5 km || 
|-id=154 bgcolor=#d6d6d6
| 144154 ||  || — || January 27, 2004 || Kitt Peak || Spacewatch || — || align=right | 3.2 km || 
|-id=155 bgcolor=#d6d6d6
| 144155 ||  || — || January 27, 2004 || Kitt Peak || Spacewatch || — || align=right | 4.8 km || 
|-id=156 bgcolor=#E9E9E9
| 144156 ||  || — || January 27, 2004 || Kitt Peak || Spacewatch || — || align=right | 5.2 km || 
|-id=157 bgcolor=#fefefe
| 144157 ||  || — || January 27, 2004 || Kitt Peak || Spacewatch || NYS || align=right data-sort-value="0.90" | 900 m || 
|-id=158 bgcolor=#d6d6d6
| 144158 ||  || — || January 27, 2004 || Kitt Peak || Spacewatch || — || align=right | 4.9 km || 
|-id=159 bgcolor=#d6d6d6
| 144159 ||  || — || January 28, 2004 || Socorro || LINEAR || K-2 || align=right | 2.1 km || 
|-id=160 bgcolor=#E9E9E9
| 144160 ||  || — || January 28, 2004 || Kitt Peak || Spacewatch || — || align=right | 2.3 km || 
|-id=161 bgcolor=#d6d6d6
| 144161 ||  || — || January 28, 2004 || Socorro || LINEAR || — || align=right | 4.7 km || 
|-id=162 bgcolor=#fefefe
| 144162 ||  || — || January 29, 2004 || Socorro || LINEAR || — || align=right | 1.6 km || 
|-id=163 bgcolor=#fefefe
| 144163 ||  || — || January 23, 2004 || Socorro || LINEAR || NYS || align=right | 1.2 km || 
|-id=164 bgcolor=#fefefe
| 144164 ||  || — || January 23, 2004 || Socorro || LINEAR || — || align=right | 2.0 km || 
|-id=165 bgcolor=#E9E9E9
| 144165 ||  || — || January 26, 2004 || Anderson Mesa || LONEOS || — || align=right | 3.0 km || 
|-id=166 bgcolor=#fefefe
| 144166 ||  || — || January 26, 2004 || Anderson Mesa || LONEOS || — || align=right | 1.7 km || 
|-id=167 bgcolor=#E9E9E9
| 144167 ||  || — || January 26, 2004 || Anderson Mesa || LONEOS || — || align=right | 4.9 km || 
|-id=168 bgcolor=#E9E9E9
| 144168 ||  || — || January 28, 2004 || Catalina || CSS || — || align=right | 3.9 km || 
|-id=169 bgcolor=#fefefe
| 144169 ||  || — || January 28, 2004 || Catalina || CSS || — || align=right | 1.6 km || 
|-id=170 bgcolor=#fefefe
| 144170 ||  || — || January 28, 2004 || Catalina || CSS || — || align=right | 1.5 km || 
|-id=171 bgcolor=#fefefe
| 144171 ||  || — || January 28, 2004 || Catalina || CSS || — || align=right | 1.2 km || 
|-id=172 bgcolor=#fefefe
| 144172 ||  || — || January 28, 2004 || Catalina || CSS || LCI || align=right | 2.0 km || 
|-id=173 bgcolor=#E9E9E9
| 144173 ||  || — || January 29, 2004 || Catalina || CSS || — || align=right | 3.4 km || 
|-id=174 bgcolor=#E9E9E9
| 144174 ||  || — || January 23, 2004 || Socorro || LINEAR || — || align=right | 1.7 km || 
|-id=175 bgcolor=#d6d6d6
| 144175 ||  || — || January 24, 2004 || Socorro || LINEAR || THM || align=right | 4.1 km || 
|-id=176 bgcolor=#d6d6d6
| 144176 ||  || — || January 28, 2004 || Socorro || LINEAR || — || align=right | 4.6 km || 
|-id=177 bgcolor=#E9E9E9
| 144177 ||  || — || January 28, 2004 || Socorro || LINEAR || — || align=right | 4.0 km || 
|-id=178 bgcolor=#fefefe
| 144178 ||  || — || January 29, 2004 || Socorro || LINEAR || NYS || align=right | 1.1 km || 
|-id=179 bgcolor=#fefefe
| 144179 ||  || — || January 29, 2004 || Anderson Mesa || LONEOS || ERI || align=right | 2.5 km || 
|-id=180 bgcolor=#d6d6d6
| 144180 ||  || — || January 29, 2004 || Anderson Mesa || LONEOS || — || align=right | 5.6 km || 
|-id=181 bgcolor=#E9E9E9
| 144181 ||  || — || January 30, 2004 || Catalina || CSS || — || align=right | 2.4 km || 
|-id=182 bgcolor=#fefefe
| 144182 ||  || — || January 26, 2004 || Anderson Mesa || LONEOS || — || align=right | 1.4 km || 
|-id=183 bgcolor=#fefefe
| 144183 ||  || — || January 26, 2004 || Anderson Mesa || LONEOS || — || align=right | 1.5 km || 
|-id=184 bgcolor=#fefefe
| 144184 ||  || — || January 28, 2004 || Catalina || CSS || V || align=right | 1.3 km || 
|-id=185 bgcolor=#E9E9E9
| 144185 ||  || — || January 28, 2004 || Catalina || CSS || — || align=right | 3.8 km || 
|-id=186 bgcolor=#E9E9E9
| 144186 ||  || — || January 30, 2004 || Catalina || CSS || — || align=right | 2.1 km || 
|-id=187 bgcolor=#E9E9E9
| 144187 ||  || — || January 30, 2004 || Catalina || CSS || GER || align=right | 3.4 km || 
|-id=188 bgcolor=#E9E9E9
| 144188 ||  || — || January 30, 2004 || Anderson Mesa || LONEOS || — || align=right | 1.9 km || 
|-id=189 bgcolor=#fefefe
| 144189 ||  || — || January 30, 2004 || Socorro || LINEAR || — || align=right | 1.6 km || 
|-id=190 bgcolor=#E9E9E9
| 144190 ||  || — || January 30, 2004 || Catalina || CSS || — || align=right | 2.6 km || 
|-id=191 bgcolor=#E9E9E9
| 144191 ||  || — || January 17, 2004 || Palomar || NEAT || BRU || align=right | 6.6 km || 
|-id=192 bgcolor=#E9E9E9
| 144192 ||  || — || January 22, 2004 || Mauna Kea || R. L. Allen || — || align=right | 3.6 km || 
|-id=193 bgcolor=#E9E9E9
| 144193 ||  || — || January 16, 2004 || Palomar || NEAT || — || align=right | 2.6 km || 
|-id=194 bgcolor=#fefefe
| 144194 ||  || — || January 17, 2004 || Palomar || NEAT || — || align=right | 1.8 km || 
|-id=195 bgcolor=#E9E9E9
| 144195 ||  || — || January 16, 2004 || Kitt Peak || Spacewatch || — || align=right | 2.2 km || 
|-id=196 bgcolor=#E9E9E9
| 144196 ||  || — || January 19, 2004 || Kitt Peak || Spacewatch || — || align=right | 1.4 km || 
|-id=197 bgcolor=#fefefe
| 144197 ||  || — || January 19, 2004 || Kitt Peak || Spacewatch || MAS || align=right data-sort-value="0.93" | 930 m || 
|-id=198 bgcolor=#E9E9E9
| 144198 ||  || — || January 22, 2004 || Socorro || LINEAR || — || align=right | 1.5 km || 
|-id=199 bgcolor=#E9E9E9
| 144199 ||  || — || January 30, 2004 || Kitt Peak || Spacewatch || — || align=right | 1.5 km || 
|-id=200 bgcolor=#d6d6d6
| 144200 || 2004 CH || — || February 2, 2004 || Socorro || LINEAR || — || align=right | 5.2 km || 
|}

144201–144300 

|-bgcolor=#fefefe
| 144201 ||  || — || February 11, 2004 || Desert Eagle || W. K. Y. Yeung || — || align=right | 1.9 km || 
|-id=202 bgcolor=#E9E9E9
| 144202 ||  || — || February 11, 2004 || Desert Eagle || W. K. Y. Yeung || — || align=right | 2.6 km || 
|-id=203 bgcolor=#E9E9E9
| 144203 ||  || — || February 10, 2004 || Palomar || NEAT || — || align=right | 2.0 km || 
|-id=204 bgcolor=#d6d6d6
| 144204 ||  || — || February 10, 2004 || Palomar || NEAT || CHA || align=right | 3.5 km || 
|-id=205 bgcolor=#fefefe
| 144205 ||  || — || February 10, 2004 || Catalina || CSS || — || align=right | 1.5 km || 
|-id=206 bgcolor=#fefefe
| 144206 ||  || — || February 11, 2004 || Kitt Peak || Spacewatch || NYS || align=right data-sort-value="0.98" | 980 m || 
|-id=207 bgcolor=#E9E9E9
| 144207 ||  || — || February 11, 2004 || Kitt Peak || Spacewatch || — || align=right | 3.6 km || 
|-id=208 bgcolor=#d6d6d6
| 144208 ||  || — || February 11, 2004 || Palomar || NEAT || URS || align=right | 6.7 km || 
|-id=209 bgcolor=#E9E9E9
| 144209 ||  || — || February 11, 2004 || Palomar || NEAT || — || align=right | 4.0 km || 
|-id=210 bgcolor=#E9E9E9
| 144210 ||  || — || February 11, 2004 || Catalina || CSS || — || align=right | 1.8 km || 
|-id=211 bgcolor=#fefefe
| 144211 ||  || — || February 11, 2004 || Catalina || CSS || MAS || align=right | 1.3 km || 
|-id=212 bgcolor=#E9E9E9
| 144212 ||  || — || February 11, 2004 || Palomar || NEAT || — || align=right | 3.5 km || 
|-id=213 bgcolor=#d6d6d6
| 144213 ||  || — || February 11, 2004 || Anderson Mesa || LONEOS || THM || align=right | 4.3 km || 
|-id=214 bgcolor=#E9E9E9
| 144214 ||  || — || February 11, 2004 || Palomar || NEAT || — || align=right | 1.4 km || 
|-id=215 bgcolor=#E9E9E9
| 144215 ||  || — || February 11, 2004 || Kitt Peak || Spacewatch || — || align=right | 2.4 km || 
|-id=216 bgcolor=#E9E9E9
| 144216 ||  || — || February 11, 2004 || Kitt Peak || Spacewatch || — || align=right | 1.8 km || 
|-id=217 bgcolor=#E9E9E9
| 144217 ||  || — || February 10, 2004 || Palomar || NEAT || HEN || align=right | 2.2 km || 
|-id=218 bgcolor=#E9E9E9
| 144218 ||  || — || February 10, 2004 || Palomar || NEAT || — || align=right | 2.8 km || 
|-id=219 bgcolor=#fefefe
| 144219 ||  || — || February 12, 2004 || Kitt Peak || Spacewatch || — || align=right data-sort-value="0.96" | 960 m || 
|-id=220 bgcolor=#fefefe
| 144220 ||  || — || February 12, 2004 || Kitt Peak || Spacewatch || V || align=right | 1.2 km || 
|-id=221 bgcolor=#fefefe
| 144221 ||  || — || February 11, 2004 || Catalina || CSS || — || align=right | 1.1 km || 
|-id=222 bgcolor=#fefefe
| 144222 ||  || — || February 11, 2004 || Palomar || NEAT || — || align=right | 1.4 km || 
|-id=223 bgcolor=#E9E9E9
| 144223 ||  || — || February 12, 2004 || Kitt Peak || Spacewatch || — || align=right | 3.6 km || 
|-id=224 bgcolor=#E9E9E9
| 144224 ||  || — || February 11, 2004 || Catalina || CSS || — || align=right | 1.7 km || 
|-id=225 bgcolor=#fefefe
| 144225 ||  || — || February 12, 2004 || Desert Eagle || W. K. Y. Yeung || NYS || align=right | 1.4 km || 
|-id=226 bgcolor=#fefefe
| 144226 ||  || — || February 13, 2004 || Palomar || NEAT || — || align=right | 1.7 km || 
|-id=227 bgcolor=#d6d6d6
| 144227 ||  || — || February 14, 2004 || Haleakala || NEAT || TEL || align=right | 2.7 km || 
|-id=228 bgcolor=#E9E9E9
| 144228 ||  || — || February 12, 2004 || Kitt Peak || Spacewatch || — || align=right | 3.1 km || 
|-id=229 bgcolor=#fefefe
| 144229 ||  || — || February 11, 2004 || Kitt Peak || Spacewatch || NYS || align=right | 1.2 km || 
|-id=230 bgcolor=#fefefe
| 144230 ||  || — || February 15, 2004 || Haleakala || NEAT || — || align=right | 1.4 km || 
|-id=231 bgcolor=#fefefe
| 144231 ||  || — || February 10, 2004 || Catalina || CSS || NYS || align=right | 1.6 km || 
|-id=232 bgcolor=#fefefe
| 144232 ||  || — || February 11, 2004 || Anderson Mesa || LONEOS || — || align=right | 1.7 km || 
|-id=233 bgcolor=#fefefe
| 144233 ||  || — || February 11, 2004 || Anderson Mesa || LONEOS || NYS || align=right | 1.1 km || 
|-id=234 bgcolor=#fefefe
| 144234 ||  || — || February 12, 2004 || Palomar || NEAT || NYS || align=right | 1.2 km || 
|-id=235 bgcolor=#fefefe
| 144235 ||  || — || February 10, 2004 || Palomar || NEAT || — || align=right | 1.5 km || 
|-id=236 bgcolor=#fefefe
| 144236 ||  || — || February 15, 2004 || Socorro || LINEAR || — || align=right | 1.6 km || 
|-id=237 bgcolor=#fefefe
| 144237 ||  || — || February 13, 2004 || Kitt Peak || Spacewatch || — || align=right | 1.5 km || 
|-id=238 bgcolor=#E9E9E9
| 144238 ||  || — || February 14, 2004 || Palomar || NEAT || — || align=right | 2.8 km || 
|-id=239 bgcolor=#fefefe
| 144239 ||  || — || February 15, 2004 || Socorro || LINEAR || NYS || align=right data-sort-value="0.82" | 820 m || 
|-id=240 bgcolor=#fefefe
| 144240 ||  || — || February 10, 2004 || Palomar || NEAT || — || align=right | 1.3 km || 
|-id=241 bgcolor=#fefefe
| 144241 ||  || — || February 10, 2004 || Palomar || NEAT || MAS || align=right | 1.5 km || 
|-id=242 bgcolor=#d6d6d6
| 144242 ||  || — || February 10, 2004 || Palomar || NEAT || — || align=right | 5.1 km || 
|-id=243 bgcolor=#fefefe
| 144243 ||  || — || February 11, 2004 || Kitt Peak || Spacewatch || FLO || align=right | 1.2 km || 
|-id=244 bgcolor=#E9E9E9
| 144244 ||  || — || February 11, 2004 || Palomar || NEAT || HEN || align=right | 1.9 km || 
|-id=245 bgcolor=#E9E9E9
| 144245 ||  || — || February 11, 2004 || Palomar || NEAT || — || align=right | 3.9 km || 
|-id=246 bgcolor=#fefefe
| 144246 ||  || — || February 11, 2004 || Palomar || NEAT || — || align=right | 1.6 km || 
|-id=247 bgcolor=#d6d6d6
| 144247 ||  || — || February 11, 2004 || Palomar || NEAT || KOR || align=right | 2.5 km || 
|-id=248 bgcolor=#E9E9E9
| 144248 ||  || — || February 11, 2004 || Palomar || NEAT || AER || align=right | 2.3 km || 
|-id=249 bgcolor=#fefefe
| 144249 ||  || — || February 12, 2004 || Kitt Peak || Spacewatch || — || align=right | 1.5 km || 
|-id=250 bgcolor=#d6d6d6
| 144250 ||  || — || February 12, 2004 || Kitt Peak || Spacewatch || — || align=right | 3.7 km || 
|-id=251 bgcolor=#E9E9E9
| 144251 ||  || — || February 12, 2004 || Kitt Peak || Spacewatch || HOF || align=right | 3.8 km || 
|-id=252 bgcolor=#d6d6d6
| 144252 ||  || — || February 12, 2004 || Kitt Peak || Spacewatch || — || align=right | 5.5 km || 
|-id=253 bgcolor=#fefefe
| 144253 ||  || — || February 13, 2004 || Kitt Peak || Spacewatch || — || align=right | 1.2 km || 
|-id=254 bgcolor=#E9E9E9
| 144254 ||  || — || February 14, 2004 || Kitt Peak || Spacewatch || — || align=right | 3.4 km || 
|-id=255 bgcolor=#fefefe
| 144255 ||  || — || February 11, 2004 || Palomar || NEAT || — || align=right | 1.7 km || 
|-id=256 bgcolor=#fefefe
| 144256 ||  || — || February 11, 2004 || Catalina || CSS || NYS || align=right | 1.1 km || 
|-id=257 bgcolor=#fefefe
| 144257 ||  || — || February 11, 2004 || Kitt Peak || Spacewatch || LCI || align=right | 1.5 km || 
|-id=258 bgcolor=#E9E9E9
| 144258 ||  || — || February 12, 2004 || Palomar || NEAT || — || align=right | 3.9 km || 
|-id=259 bgcolor=#E9E9E9
| 144259 ||  || — || February 15, 2004 || Socorro || LINEAR || — || align=right | 1.7 km || 
|-id=260 bgcolor=#d6d6d6
| 144260 ||  || — || February 15, 2004 || Socorro || LINEAR || — || align=right | 4.8 km || 
|-id=261 bgcolor=#E9E9E9
| 144261 ||  || — || February 11, 2004 || Catalina || CSS || — || align=right | 2.3 km || 
|-id=262 bgcolor=#E9E9E9
| 144262 ||  || — || February 11, 2004 || Palomar || NEAT || — || align=right | 1.8 km || 
|-id=263 bgcolor=#d6d6d6
| 144263 ||  || — || February 12, 2004 || Palomar || NEAT || CHA || align=right | 3.3 km || 
|-id=264 bgcolor=#E9E9E9
| 144264 ||  || — || February 13, 2004 || Palomar || NEAT || AGN || align=right | 2.2 km || 
|-id=265 bgcolor=#E9E9E9
| 144265 ||  || — || February 13, 2004 || Palomar || NEAT || MAR || align=right | 3.6 km || 
|-id=266 bgcolor=#fefefe
| 144266 ||  || — || February 14, 2004 || Kitt Peak || Spacewatch || V || align=right | 1.1 km || 
|-id=267 bgcolor=#d6d6d6
| 144267 ||  || — || February 14, 2004 || Kitt Peak || Spacewatch || — || align=right | 7.0 km || 
|-id=268 bgcolor=#E9E9E9
| 144268 ||  || — || February 14, 2004 || Kitt Peak || Spacewatch || — || align=right | 4.0 km || 
|-id=269 bgcolor=#fefefe
| 144269 ||  || — || February 14, 2004 || Kitt Peak || Spacewatch || NYS || align=right | 1.0 km || 
|-id=270 bgcolor=#E9E9E9
| 144270 ||  || — || February 15, 2004 || Socorro || LINEAR || — || align=right | 2.0 km || 
|-id=271 bgcolor=#d6d6d6
| 144271 ||  || — || February 12, 2004 || Palomar || NEAT || — || align=right | 5.1 km || 
|-id=272 bgcolor=#E9E9E9
| 144272 ||  || — || February 13, 2004 || Palomar || NEAT || — || align=right | 2.9 km || 
|-id=273 bgcolor=#d6d6d6
| 144273 ||  || — || February 13, 2004 || Palomar || NEAT || — || align=right | 9.4 km || 
|-id=274 bgcolor=#E9E9E9
| 144274 ||  || — || February 14, 2004 || Socorro || LINEAR || — || align=right | 2.9 km || 
|-id=275 bgcolor=#d6d6d6
| 144275 ||  || — || February 14, 2004 || Catalina || CSS || HYG || align=right | 4.6 km || 
|-id=276 bgcolor=#fefefe
| 144276 ||  || — || February 15, 2004 || Catalina || CSS || — || align=right | 1.6 km || 
|-id=277 bgcolor=#fefefe
| 144277 ||  || — || February 15, 2004 || Catalina || CSS || NYS || align=right | 1.2 km || 
|-id=278 bgcolor=#fefefe
| 144278 ||  || — || February 15, 2004 || Catalina || CSS || NYS || align=right | 1.0 km || 
|-id=279 bgcolor=#E9E9E9
| 144279 ||  || — || February 15, 2004 || Catalina || CSS || — || align=right | 4.2 km || 
|-id=280 bgcolor=#E9E9E9
| 144280 ||  || — || February 15, 2004 || Catalina || CSS || EUN || align=right | 1.7 km || 
|-id=281 bgcolor=#d6d6d6
| 144281 ||  || — || February 12, 2004 || Palomar || NEAT || — || align=right | 4.1 km || 
|-id=282 bgcolor=#d6d6d6
| 144282 ||  || — || February 13, 2004 || Palomar || NEAT || — || align=right | 6.0 km || 
|-id=283 bgcolor=#E9E9E9
| 144283 ||  || — || February 14, 2004 || Palomar || NEAT || INO || align=right | 2.4 km || 
|-id=284 bgcolor=#fefefe
| 144284 ||  || — || February 14, 2004 || Kitt Peak || Spacewatch || MAS || align=right | 1.2 km || 
|-id=285 bgcolor=#E9E9E9
| 144285 ||  || — || February 15, 2004 || Catalina || CSS || — || align=right | 2.9 km || 
|-id=286 bgcolor=#d6d6d6
| 144286 ||  || — || February 15, 2004 || Catalina || CSS || — || align=right | 3.6 km || 
|-id=287 bgcolor=#E9E9E9
| 144287 ||  || — || February 14, 2004 || Palomar || NEAT || — || align=right | 4.1 km || 
|-id=288 bgcolor=#fefefe
| 144288 ||  || — || February 13, 2004 || Kitt Peak || Spacewatch || MAS || align=right | 1.3 km || 
|-id=289 bgcolor=#E9E9E9
| 144289 ||  || — || February 13, 2004 || Anderson Mesa || LONEOS || — || align=right | 1.9 km || 
|-id=290 bgcolor=#fefefe
| 144290 ||  || — || February 11, 2004 || Palomar || NEAT || V || align=right | 1.1 km || 
|-id=291 bgcolor=#E9E9E9
| 144291 ||  || — || February 11, 2004 || Palomar || NEAT || — || align=right | 4.3 km || 
|-id=292 bgcolor=#fefefe
| 144292 ||  || — || February 11, 2004 || Kitt Peak || Spacewatch || MAS || align=right | 1.1 km || 
|-id=293 bgcolor=#E9E9E9
| 144293 ||  || — || February 12, 2004 || Palomar || NEAT || — || align=right | 2.7 km || 
|-id=294 bgcolor=#fefefe
| 144294 ||  || — || February 12, 2004 || Kitt Peak || Spacewatch || V || align=right | 1.0 km || 
|-id=295 bgcolor=#fefefe
| 144295 ||  || — || February 14, 2004 || Kitt Peak || Spacewatch || NYS || align=right data-sort-value="0.96" | 960 m || 
|-id=296 bgcolor=#fefefe
| 144296 Steviewonder || 2004 DF ||  || February 16, 2004 || Desert Eagle || W. K. Y. Yeung || — || align=right | 1.7 km || 
|-id=297 bgcolor=#fefefe
| 144297 || 2004 DS || — || February 16, 2004 || Kitt Peak || Spacewatch || — || align=right | 1.3 km || 
|-id=298 bgcolor=#fefefe
| 144298 || 2004 DY || — || February 16, 2004 || Socorro || LINEAR || — || align=right | 2.6 km || 
|-id=299 bgcolor=#E9E9E9
| 144299 ||  || — || February 16, 2004 || Kitt Peak || Spacewatch || MAR || align=right | 1.8 km || 
|-id=300 bgcolor=#fefefe
| 144300 ||  || — || February 16, 2004 || Kitt Peak || Spacewatch || — || align=right | 1.5 km || 
|}

144301–144400 

|-bgcolor=#fefefe
| 144301 ||  || — || February 16, 2004 || Kvistaberg || UDAS || ERI || align=right | 3.3 km || 
|-id=302 bgcolor=#E9E9E9
| 144302 ||  || — || February 16, 2004 || Kitt Peak || Spacewatch || — || align=right | 1.8 km || 
|-id=303 bgcolor=#E9E9E9
| 144303 Mirellabreschi ||  ||  || February 16, 2004 || San Marcello || L. Tesi, G. Fagioli || AER || align=right | 1.6 km || 
|-id=304 bgcolor=#E9E9E9
| 144304 ||  || — || February 17, 2004 || Kitt Peak || Spacewatch || — || align=right | 2.3 km || 
|-id=305 bgcolor=#fefefe
| 144305 ||  || — || February 17, 2004 || Kitt Peak || Spacewatch || NYS || align=right | 1.2 km || 
|-id=306 bgcolor=#fefefe
| 144306 ||  || — || February 16, 2004 || Kitt Peak || Spacewatch || NYS || align=right | 1.3 km || 
|-id=307 bgcolor=#E9E9E9
| 144307 ||  || — || February 16, 2004 || Kitt Peak || Spacewatch || — || align=right | 1.5 km || 
|-id=308 bgcolor=#fefefe
| 144308 ||  || — || February 17, 2004 || Kitt Peak || Spacewatch || MAS || align=right | 1.2 km || 
|-id=309 bgcolor=#fefefe
| 144309 ||  || — || February 16, 2004 || Catalina || CSS || FLO || align=right data-sort-value="0.98" | 980 m || 
|-id=310 bgcolor=#E9E9E9
| 144310 ||  || — || February 16, 2004 || Catalina || CSS || RAF || align=right | 1.6 km || 
|-id=311 bgcolor=#E9E9E9
| 144311 ||  || — || February 16, 2004 || Catalina || CSS || — || align=right | 3.8 km || 
|-id=312 bgcolor=#fefefe
| 144312 ||  || — || February 16, 2004 || Kitt Peak || Spacewatch || NYS || align=right data-sort-value="0.86" | 860 m || 
|-id=313 bgcolor=#E9E9E9
| 144313 ||  || — || February 17, 2004 || Socorro || LINEAR || — || align=right | 4.1 km || 
|-id=314 bgcolor=#fefefe
| 144314 ||  || — || February 17, 2004 || Kitt Peak || Spacewatch || NYS || align=right | 1.2 km || 
|-id=315 bgcolor=#E9E9E9
| 144315 ||  || — || February 17, 2004 || Haleakala || NEAT || GER || align=right | 2.5 km || 
|-id=316 bgcolor=#fefefe
| 144316 ||  || — || February 18, 2004 || Socorro || LINEAR || — || align=right | 1.2 km || 
|-id=317 bgcolor=#d6d6d6
| 144317 ||  || — || February 18, 2004 || Kitt Peak || Spacewatch || — || align=right | 6.1 km || 
|-id=318 bgcolor=#fefefe
| 144318 ||  || — || February 18, 2004 || Haleakala || NEAT || — || align=right | 1.3 km || 
|-id=319 bgcolor=#E9E9E9
| 144319 ||  || — || February 18, 2004 || Haleakala || NEAT || — || align=right | 4.0 km || 
|-id=320 bgcolor=#E9E9E9
| 144320 ||  || — || February 18, 2004 || Haleakala || NEAT || — || align=right | 1.5 km || 
|-id=321 bgcolor=#E9E9E9
| 144321 ||  || — || February 17, 2004 || Socorro || LINEAR || — || align=right | 1.8 km || 
|-id=322 bgcolor=#fefefe
| 144322 ||  || — || February 17, 2004 || Catalina || CSS || — || align=right | 1.6 km || 
|-id=323 bgcolor=#fefefe
| 144323 ||  || — || February 17, 2004 || Catalina || CSS || V || align=right | 1.4 km || 
|-id=324 bgcolor=#fefefe
| 144324 ||  || — || February 17, 2004 || Socorro || LINEAR || NYS || align=right | 1.4 km || 
|-id=325 bgcolor=#fefefe
| 144325 ||  || — || February 17, 2004 || Socorro || LINEAR || — || align=right | 1.6 km || 
|-id=326 bgcolor=#fefefe
| 144326 ||  || — || February 17, 2004 || Catalina || CSS || FLO || align=right | 1.3 km || 
|-id=327 bgcolor=#fefefe
| 144327 ||  || — || February 17, 2004 || Catalina || CSS || NYS || align=right | 1.4 km || 
|-id=328 bgcolor=#fefefe
| 144328 ||  || — || February 18, 2004 || Socorro || LINEAR || NYS || align=right | 1.0 km || 
|-id=329 bgcolor=#E9E9E9
| 144329 ||  || — || February 18, 2004 || Socorro || LINEAR || MAR || align=right | 3.6 km || 
|-id=330 bgcolor=#fefefe
| 144330 ||  || — || February 19, 2004 || Socorro || LINEAR || — || align=right | 1.4 km || 
|-id=331 bgcolor=#fefefe
| 144331 ||  || — || February 19, 2004 || Socorro || LINEAR || V || align=right | 1.3 km || 
|-id=332 bgcolor=#FFC2E0
| 144332 ||  || — || February 21, 2004 || Haleakala || NEAT || APO +1kmPHA || align=right | 1.7 km || 
|-id=333 bgcolor=#E9E9E9
| 144333 Marcinkiewicz ||  ||  || February 20, 2004 || Altschwendt || W. Ries || — || align=right | 3.0 km || 
|-id=334 bgcolor=#E9E9E9
| 144334 ||  || — || February 16, 2004 || Kitt Peak || Spacewatch || — || align=right | 2.4 km || 
|-id=335 bgcolor=#E9E9E9
| 144335 ||  || — || February 17, 2004 || Kitt Peak || Spacewatch || — || align=right | 3.2 km || 
|-id=336 bgcolor=#d6d6d6
| 144336 ||  || — || February 17, 2004 || Socorro || LINEAR || — || align=right | 5.0 km || 
|-id=337 bgcolor=#fefefe
| 144337 ||  || — || February 17, 2004 || Socorro || LINEAR || — || align=right | 1.3 km || 
|-id=338 bgcolor=#d6d6d6
| 144338 ||  || — || February 17, 2004 || Socorro || LINEAR || BRA || align=right | 3.2 km || 
|-id=339 bgcolor=#d6d6d6
| 144339 ||  || — || February 17, 2004 || Kitt Peak || Spacewatch || EOS || align=right | 3.0 km || 
|-id=340 bgcolor=#fefefe
| 144340 ||  || — || February 18, 2004 || Socorro || LINEAR || — || align=right | 1.4 km || 
|-id=341 bgcolor=#E9E9E9
| 144341 ||  || — || February 18, 2004 || Socorro || LINEAR || — || align=right | 1.6 km || 
|-id=342 bgcolor=#E9E9E9
| 144342 ||  || — || February 18, 2004 || Socorro || LINEAR || — || align=right | 1.8 km || 
|-id=343 bgcolor=#fefefe
| 144343 ||  || — || February 18, 2004 || Socorro || LINEAR || MAS || align=right | 1.5 km || 
|-id=344 bgcolor=#fefefe
| 144344 ||  || — || February 18, 2004 || Socorro || LINEAR || — || align=right | 1.4 km || 
|-id=345 bgcolor=#E9E9E9
| 144345 ||  || — || February 18, 2004 || Haleakala || NEAT || — || align=right | 2.6 km || 
|-id=346 bgcolor=#fefefe
| 144346 ||  || — || February 19, 2004 || Socorro || LINEAR || V || align=right | 1.4 km || 
|-id=347 bgcolor=#d6d6d6
| 144347 ||  || — || February 19, 2004 || Socorro || LINEAR || — || align=right | 3.6 km || 
|-id=348 bgcolor=#fefefe
| 144348 ||  || — || February 19, 2004 || Socorro || LINEAR || NYS || align=right | 1.1 km || 
|-id=349 bgcolor=#E9E9E9
| 144349 ||  || — || February 19, 2004 || Socorro || LINEAR || — || align=right | 2.5 km || 
|-id=350 bgcolor=#E9E9E9
| 144350 ||  || — || February 19, 2004 || Socorro || LINEAR || — || align=right | 2.6 km || 
|-id=351 bgcolor=#E9E9E9
| 144351 ||  || — || February 19, 2004 || Socorro || LINEAR || — || align=right | 1.5 km || 
|-id=352 bgcolor=#d6d6d6
| 144352 ||  || — || February 19, 2004 || Socorro || LINEAR || EOS || align=right | 3.2 km || 
|-id=353 bgcolor=#fefefe
| 144353 ||  || — || February 16, 2004 || Kitt Peak || Spacewatch || MAS || align=right | 1.1 km || 
|-id=354 bgcolor=#d6d6d6
| 144354 ||  || — || February 18, 2004 || Socorro || LINEAR || HYG || align=right | 5.9 km || 
|-id=355 bgcolor=#d6d6d6
| 144355 ||  || — || February 18, 2004 || Haleakala || NEAT || — || align=right | 5.4 km || 
|-id=356 bgcolor=#d6d6d6
| 144356 ||  || — || February 18, 2004 || Haleakala || NEAT || — || align=right | 5.8 km || 
|-id=357 bgcolor=#E9E9E9
| 144357 ||  || — || February 19, 2004 || Socorro || LINEAR || — || align=right | 1.7 km || 
|-id=358 bgcolor=#E9E9E9
| 144358 ||  || — || February 19, 2004 || Socorro || LINEAR || — || align=right | 1.6 km || 
|-id=359 bgcolor=#E9E9E9
| 144359 ||  || — || February 19, 2004 || Socorro || LINEAR || MAR || align=right | 1.7 km || 
|-id=360 bgcolor=#d6d6d6
| 144360 ||  || — || February 17, 2004 || Socorro || LINEAR || EUP || align=right | 6.7 km || 
|-id=361 bgcolor=#fefefe
| 144361 ||  || — || February 19, 2004 || Socorro || LINEAR || — || align=right | 1.2 km || 
|-id=362 bgcolor=#d6d6d6
| 144362 Swantner ||  ||  || February 26, 2004 || Jornada || D. S. Dixon || URS || align=right | 4.4 km || 
|-id=363 bgcolor=#d6d6d6
| 144363 ||  || — || February 19, 2004 || Socorro || LINEAR || EOS || align=right | 3.5 km || 
|-id=364 bgcolor=#E9E9E9
| 144364 ||  || — || February 19, 2004 || Socorro || LINEAR || — || align=right | 4.4 km || 
|-id=365 bgcolor=#E9E9E9
| 144365 ||  || — || February 19, 2004 || Socorro || LINEAR || — || align=right | 1.7 km || 
|-id=366 bgcolor=#d6d6d6
| 144366 ||  || — || February 19, 2004 || Socorro || LINEAR || KOR || align=right | 2.5 km || 
|-id=367 bgcolor=#d6d6d6
| 144367 ||  || — || February 19, 2004 || Socorro || LINEAR || — || align=right | 4.3 km || 
|-id=368 bgcolor=#fefefe
| 144368 ||  || — || February 19, 2004 || Socorro || LINEAR || — || align=right | 1.2 km || 
|-id=369 bgcolor=#E9E9E9
| 144369 ||  || — || February 19, 2004 || Socorro || LINEAR || — || align=right | 3.8 km || 
|-id=370 bgcolor=#fefefe
| 144370 ||  || — || February 19, 2004 || Socorro || LINEAR || MAS || align=right | 1.2 km || 
|-id=371 bgcolor=#E9E9E9
| 144371 ||  || — || February 19, 2004 || Socorro || LINEAR || PAD || align=right | 3.0 km || 
|-id=372 bgcolor=#fefefe
| 144372 ||  || — || February 23, 2004 || Socorro || LINEAR || — || align=right | 1.3 km || 
|-id=373 bgcolor=#fefefe
| 144373 ||  || — || February 20, 2004 || Haleakala || NEAT || — || align=right | 1.7 km || 
|-id=374 bgcolor=#E9E9E9
| 144374 ||  || — || February 22, 2004 || Kitt Peak || Spacewatch || — || align=right | 1.3 km || 
|-id=375 bgcolor=#d6d6d6
| 144375 ||  || — || February 22, 2004 || Kitt Peak || Spacewatch || BRA || align=right | 2.2 km || 
|-id=376 bgcolor=#E9E9E9
| 144376 ||  || — || February 25, 2004 || Socorro || LINEAR || WIT || align=right | 1.8 km || 
|-id=377 bgcolor=#fefefe
| 144377 ||  || — || February 26, 2004 || Desert Eagle || W. K. Y. Yeung || — || align=right data-sort-value="0.87" | 870 m || 
|-id=378 bgcolor=#E9E9E9
| 144378 ||  || — || February 26, 2004 || Socorro || LINEAR || — || align=right | 3.4 km || 
|-id=379 bgcolor=#d6d6d6
| 144379 ||  || — || February 26, 2004 || Socorro || LINEAR || VER || align=right | 3.8 km || 
|-id=380 bgcolor=#E9E9E9
| 144380 ||  || — || February 26, 2004 || Socorro || LINEAR || — || align=right | 1.3 km || 
|-id=381 bgcolor=#E9E9E9
| 144381 ||  || — || February 26, 2004 || Socorro || LINEAR || — || align=right | 2.8 km || 
|-id=382 bgcolor=#E9E9E9
| 144382 ||  || — || February 29, 2004 || Kitt Peak || Spacewatch || NEM || align=right | 2.7 km || 
|-id=383 bgcolor=#fefefe
| 144383 ||  || — || February 22, 2004 || Kitt Peak || M. W. Buie || MAS || align=right | 1.1 km || 
|-id=384 bgcolor=#E9E9E9
| 144384 ||  || — || February 23, 2004 || Socorro || LINEAR || — || align=right | 3.0 km || 
|-id=385 bgcolor=#E9E9E9
| 144385 ||  || — || February 26, 2004 || Kitt Peak || M. W. Buie || — || align=right | 4.7 km || 
|-id=386 bgcolor=#fefefe
| 144386 Emmabirath ||  ||  || February 27, 2004 || Kitt Peak || M. W. Buie || — || align=right data-sort-value="0.84" | 840 m || 
|-id=387 bgcolor=#E9E9E9
| 144387 ||  || — || February 16, 2004 || Socorro || LINEAR || MAR || align=right | 2.5 km || 
|-id=388 bgcolor=#d6d6d6
| 144388 ||  || — || February 16, 2004 || Kitt Peak || Spacewatch || — || align=right | 4.1 km || 
|-id=389 bgcolor=#E9E9E9
| 144389 ||  || — || February 16, 2004 || Kitt Peak || Spacewatch || — || align=right | 2.3 km || 
|-id=390 bgcolor=#fefefe
| 144390 ||  || — || February 17, 2004 || Kitt Peak || Spacewatch || NYS || align=right data-sort-value="0.94" | 940 m || 
|-id=391 bgcolor=#d6d6d6
| 144391 || 2004 EK || — || March 11, 2004 || Needville || Needville Obs. || KOR || align=right | 2.3 km || 
|-id=392 bgcolor=#E9E9E9
| 144392 ||  || — || March 10, 2004 || Palomar || NEAT || — || align=right | 3.2 km || 
|-id=393 bgcolor=#E9E9E9
| 144393 ||  || — || March 11, 2004 || Palomar || NEAT || — || align=right | 2.2 km || 
|-id=394 bgcolor=#E9E9E9
| 144394 ||  || — || March 13, 2004 || Palomar || NEAT || — || align=right | 3.4 km || 
|-id=395 bgcolor=#E9E9E9
| 144395 ||  || — || March 13, 2004 || Palomar || NEAT || — || align=right | 2.6 km || 
|-id=396 bgcolor=#E9E9E9
| 144396 ||  || — || March 10, 2004 || Palomar || NEAT || — || align=right | 3.8 km || 
|-id=397 bgcolor=#fefefe
| 144397 ||  || — || March 10, 2004 || Palomar || NEAT || — || align=right | 2.0 km || 
|-id=398 bgcolor=#E9E9E9
| 144398 ||  || — || March 11, 2004 || Palomar || NEAT || — || align=right | 3.9 km || 
|-id=399 bgcolor=#d6d6d6
| 144399 ||  || — || March 12, 2004 || Palomar || NEAT || — || align=right | 3.8 km || 
|-id=400 bgcolor=#fefefe
| 144400 ||  || — || March 12, 2004 || Palomar || NEAT || NYS || align=right data-sort-value="0.94" | 940 m || 
|}

144401–144500 

|-bgcolor=#E9E9E9
| 144401 ||  || — || March 12, 2004 || Palomar || NEAT || — || align=right | 2.0 km || 
|-id=402 bgcolor=#d6d6d6
| 144402 ||  || — || March 12, 2004 || Palomar || NEAT || THM || align=right | 4.5 km || 
|-id=403 bgcolor=#E9E9E9
| 144403 ||  || — || March 12, 2004 || Palomar || NEAT || — || align=right | 1.6 km || 
|-id=404 bgcolor=#E9E9E9
| 144404 ||  || — || March 12, 2004 || Palomar || NEAT || — || align=right | 2.1 km || 
|-id=405 bgcolor=#d6d6d6
| 144405 ||  || — || March 12, 2004 || Palomar || NEAT || VER || align=right | 6.2 km || 
|-id=406 bgcolor=#E9E9E9
| 144406 ||  || — || March 13, 2004 || Palomar || NEAT || — || align=right | 2.8 km || 
|-id=407 bgcolor=#E9E9E9
| 144407 ||  || — || March 13, 2004 || Palomar || NEAT || 526 || align=right | 4.1 km || 
|-id=408 bgcolor=#d6d6d6
| 144408 ||  || — || March 14, 2004 || Palomar || NEAT || — || align=right | 4.1 km || 
|-id=409 bgcolor=#E9E9E9
| 144409 ||  || — || March 14, 2004 || Palomar || NEAT || — || align=right | 2.0 km || 
|-id=410 bgcolor=#d6d6d6
| 144410 ||  || — || March 14, 2004 || Palomar || NEAT || LAU || align=right | 1.8 km || 
|-id=411 bgcolor=#FFC2E0
| 144411 ||  || — || March 15, 2004 || Palomar || NEAT || APO +1km || align=right | 1.8 km || 
|-id=412 bgcolor=#E9E9E9
| 144412 ||  || — || March 14, 2004 || Kitt Peak || Spacewatch || — || align=right | 3.1 km || 
|-id=413 bgcolor=#fefefe
| 144413 ||  || — || March 10, 2004 || Palomar || NEAT || — || align=right | 1.4 km || 
|-id=414 bgcolor=#d6d6d6
| 144414 ||  || — || March 10, 2004 || Palomar || NEAT || — || align=right | 4.3 km || 
|-id=415 bgcolor=#E9E9E9
| 144415 ||  || — || March 10, 2004 || Palomar || NEAT || — || align=right | 2.9 km || 
|-id=416 bgcolor=#fefefe
| 144416 ||  || — || March 11, 2004 || Palomar || NEAT || FLO || align=right data-sort-value="0.99" | 990 m || 
|-id=417 bgcolor=#d6d6d6
| 144417 ||  || — || March 11, 2004 || Palomar || NEAT || — || align=right | 4.6 km || 
|-id=418 bgcolor=#fefefe
| 144418 ||  || — || March 11, 2004 || Palomar || NEAT || — || align=right | 1.5 km || 
|-id=419 bgcolor=#d6d6d6
| 144419 ||  || — || March 11, 2004 || Palomar || NEAT || BRA || align=right | 3.8 km || 
|-id=420 bgcolor=#E9E9E9
| 144420 ||  || — || March 11, 2004 || Palomar || NEAT || — || align=right | 4.0 km || 
|-id=421 bgcolor=#d6d6d6
| 144421 ||  || — || March 12, 2004 || Palomar || NEAT || HYG || align=right | 5.6 km || 
|-id=422 bgcolor=#E9E9E9
| 144422 ||  || — || March 13, 2004 || Palomar || NEAT || EUN || align=right | 2.5 km || 
|-id=423 bgcolor=#d6d6d6
| 144423 ||  || — || March 14, 2004 || Kitt Peak || Spacewatch || — || align=right | 4.4 km || 
|-id=424 bgcolor=#E9E9E9
| 144424 ||  || — || March 14, 2004 || Kitt Peak || Spacewatch || — || align=right | 2.9 km || 
|-id=425 bgcolor=#E9E9E9
| 144425 ||  || — || March 15, 2004 || Socorro || LINEAR || — || align=right | 2.4 km || 
|-id=426 bgcolor=#d6d6d6
| 144426 ||  || — || March 15, 2004 || Catalina || CSS || URS || align=right | 5.6 km || 
|-id=427 bgcolor=#E9E9E9
| 144427 ||  || — || March 14, 2004 || Socorro || LINEAR || — || align=right | 2.0 km || 
|-id=428 bgcolor=#E9E9E9
| 144428 ||  || — || March 14, 2004 || Catalina || CSS || — || align=right | 1.7 km || 
|-id=429 bgcolor=#d6d6d6
| 144429 ||  || — || March 15, 2004 || Kitt Peak || Spacewatch || — || align=right | 4.1 km || 
|-id=430 bgcolor=#d6d6d6
| 144430 ||  || — || March 14, 2004 || Palomar || NEAT || — || align=right | 4.9 km || 
|-id=431 bgcolor=#fefefe
| 144431 ||  || — || March 14, 2004 || Palomar || NEAT || V || align=right | 1.4 km || 
|-id=432 bgcolor=#E9E9E9
| 144432 ||  || — || March 15, 2004 || Palomar || NEAT || — || align=right | 4.1 km || 
|-id=433 bgcolor=#E9E9E9
| 144433 ||  || — || March 15, 2004 || Palomar || NEAT || MAR || align=right | 1.8 km || 
|-id=434 bgcolor=#E9E9E9
| 144434 ||  || — || March 15, 2004 || Palomar || NEAT || — || align=right | 5.2 km || 
|-id=435 bgcolor=#d6d6d6
| 144435 ||  || — || March 11, 2004 || Palomar || NEAT || KOR || align=right | 2.8 km || 
|-id=436 bgcolor=#fefefe
| 144436 ||  || — || March 12, 2004 || Palomar || NEAT || — || align=right | 1.2 km || 
|-id=437 bgcolor=#E9E9E9
| 144437 ||  || — || March 12, 2004 || Palomar || NEAT || AGN || align=right | 2.2 km || 
|-id=438 bgcolor=#fefefe
| 144438 ||  || — || March 12, 2004 || Palomar || NEAT || — || align=right | 1.2 km || 
|-id=439 bgcolor=#E9E9E9
| 144439 ||  || — || March 12, 2004 || Palomar || NEAT || WIT || align=right | 2.0 km || 
|-id=440 bgcolor=#d6d6d6
| 144440 ||  || — || March 12, 2004 || Palomar || NEAT || — || align=right | 5.0 km || 
|-id=441 bgcolor=#d6d6d6
| 144441 ||  || — || March 12, 2004 || Palomar || NEAT || — || align=right | 5.3 km || 
|-id=442 bgcolor=#d6d6d6
| 144442 ||  || — || March 13, 2004 || Palomar || NEAT || EOS || align=right | 4.0 km || 
|-id=443 bgcolor=#d6d6d6
| 144443 ||  || — || March 14, 2004 || Catalina || CSS || 7:4* || align=right | 5.5 km || 
|-id=444 bgcolor=#E9E9E9
| 144444 ||  || — || March 14, 2004 || Kitt Peak || Spacewatch || — || align=right | 3.1 km || 
|-id=445 bgcolor=#d6d6d6
| 144445 ||  || — || March 14, 2004 || Kitt Peak || Spacewatch || — || align=right | 4.1 km || 
|-id=446 bgcolor=#d6d6d6
| 144446 ||  || — || March 14, 2004 || Catalina || CSS || TIR || align=right | 3.4 km || 
|-id=447 bgcolor=#E9E9E9
| 144447 ||  || — || March 15, 2004 || Kitt Peak || Spacewatch || HEN || align=right | 2.0 km || 
|-id=448 bgcolor=#E9E9E9
| 144448 ||  || — || March 15, 2004 || Kitt Peak || Spacewatch || — || align=right | 3.4 km || 
|-id=449 bgcolor=#fefefe
| 144449 ||  || — || March 15, 2004 || Catalina || CSS || MAS || align=right | 1.0 km || 
|-id=450 bgcolor=#d6d6d6
| 144450 ||  || — || March 15, 2004 || Catalina || CSS || — || align=right | 3.6 km || 
|-id=451 bgcolor=#E9E9E9
| 144451 ||  || — || March 15, 2004 || Kitt Peak || Spacewatch || HOF || align=right | 4.0 km || 
|-id=452 bgcolor=#d6d6d6
| 144452 ||  || — || March 15, 2004 || Kitt Peak || Spacewatch || — || align=right | 4.9 km || 
|-id=453 bgcolor=#E9E9E9
| 144453 ||  || — || March 15, 2004 || Catalina || CSS || — || align=right | 2.5 km || 
|-id=454 bgcolor=#fefefe
| 144454 ||  || — || March 15, 2004 || Catalina || CSS || — || align=right | 1.3 km || 
|-id=455 bgcolor=#d6d6d6
| 144455 ||  || — || March 15, 2004 || Catalina || CSS || BRA || align=right | 2.6 km || 
|-id=456 bgcolor=#d6d6d6
| 144456 ||  || — || March 15, 2004 || Catalina || CSS || KOR || align=right | 2.6 km || 
|-id=457 bgcolor=#d6d6d6
| 144457 ||  || — || March 15, 2004 || Catalina || CSS || — || align=right | 5.8 km || 
|-id=458 bgcolor=#fefefe
| 144458 ||  || — || March 11, 2004 || Palomar || NEAT || MAS || align=right | 1.2 km || 
|-id=459 bgcolor=#d6d6d6
| 144459 ||  || — || March 12, 2004 || Palomar || NEAT || — || align=right | 4.3 km || 
|-id=460 bgcolor=#E9E9E9
| 144460 ||  || — || March 12, 2004 || Palomar || NEAT || NEM || align=right | 3.0 km || 
|-id=461 bgcolor=#fefefe
| 144461 ||  || — || March 14, 2004 || Kitt Peak || Spacewatch || NYS || align=right data-sort-value="0.89" | 890 m || 
|-id=462 bgcolor=#d6d6d6
| 144462 ||  || — || March 15, 2004 || Catalina || CSS || — || align=right | 4.6 km || 
|-id=463 bgcolor=#d6d6d6
| 144463 ||  || — || March 15, 2004 || Socorro || LINEAR || — || align=right | 5.0 km || 
|-id=464 bgcolor=#E9E9E9
| 144464 ||  || — || March 15, 2004 || Socorro || LINEAR || — || align=right | 2.5 km || 
|-id=465 bgcolor=#E9E9E9
| 144465 ||  || — || March 15, 2004 || Socorro || LINEAR || WIT || align=right | 1.9 km || 
|-id=466 bgcolor=#E9E9E9
| 144466 ||  || — || March 15, 2004 || Catalina || CSS || — || align=right | 3.6 km || 
|-id=467 bgcolor=#fefefe
| 144467 ||  || — || March 15, 2004 || Socorro || LINEAR || NYS || align=right | 1.2 km || 
|-id=468 bgcolor=#E9E9E9
| 144468 ||  || — || March 15, 2004 || Catalina || CSS || XIZ || align=right | 1.9 km || 
|-id=469 bgcolor=#d6d6d6
| 144469 ||  || — || March 14, 2004 || Palomar || NEAT || — || align=right | 6.5 km || 
|-id=470 bgcolor=#E9E9E9
| 144470 ||  || — || March 14, 2004 || Palomar || NEAT || — || align=right | 3.2 km || 
|-id=471 bgcolor=#E9E9E9
| 144471 ||  || — || March 14, 2004 || Palomar || NEAT || — || align=right | 2.8 km || 
|-id=472 bgcolor=#d6d6d6
| 144472 ||  || — || March 14, 2004 || Palomar || NEAT || — || align=right | 5.0 km || 
|-id=473 bgcolor=#E9E9E9
| 144473 ||  || — || March 14, 2004 || Palomar || NEAT || GEF || align=right | 2.5 km || 
|-id=474 bgcolor=#fefefe
| 144474 ||  || — || March 14, 2004 || Palomar || NEAT || FLO || align=right | 1.2 km || 
|-id=475 bgcolor=#d6d6d6
| 144475 ||  || — || March 14, 2004 || Palomar || NEAT || — || align=right | 6.6 km || 
|-id=476 bgcolor=#E9E9E9
| 144476 ||  || — || March 14, 2004 || Palomar || NEAT || ADE || align=right | 3.6 km || 
|-id=477 bgcolor=#E9E9E9
| 144477 ||  || — || March 14, 2004 || Palomar || NEAT || — || align=right | 4.5 km || 
|-id=478 bgcolor=#fefefe
| 144478 ||  || — || March 14, 2004 || Palomar || NEAT || — || align=right | 1.5 km || 
|-id=479 bgcolor=#d6d6d6
| 144479 ||  || — || March 15, 2004 || Kitt Peak || Spacewatch || URS || align=right | 5.5 km || 
|-id=480 bgcolor=#d6d6d6
| 144480 ||  || — || March 15, 2004 || Palomar || NEAT || ALA || align=right | 7.3 km || 
|-id=481 bgcolor=#d6d6d6
| 144481 ||  || — || March 15, 2004 || Palomar || NEAT || URS || align=right | 7.9 km || 
|-id=482 bgcolor=#E9E9E9
| 144482 ||  || — || March 15, 2004 || Catalina || CSS || CLO || align=right | 5.1 km || 
|-id=483 bgcolor=#E9E9E9
| 144483 ||  || — || March 15, 2004 || Palomar || NEAT || — || align=right | 3.8 km || 
|-id=484 bgcolor=#d6d6d6
| 144484 ||  || — || March 12, 2004 || Palomar || NEAT || KAR || align=right | 2.0 km || 
|-id=485 bgcolor=#E9E9E9
| 144485 ||  || — || March 12, 2004 || Palomar || NEAT || — || align=right | 2.9 km || 
|-id=486 bgcolor=#d6d6d6
| 144486 ||  || — || March 13, 2004 || Palomar || NEAT || — || align=right | 4.4 km || 
|-id=487 bgcolor=#fefefe
| 144487 ||  || — || March 13, 2004 || Palomar || NEAT || NYS || align=right | 1.0 km || 
|-id=488 bgcolor=#E9E9E9
| 144488 ||  || — || March 13, 2004 || Palomar || NEAT || — || align=right | 3.3 km || 
|-id=489 bgcolor=#d6d6d6
| 144489 ||  || — || March 13, 2004 || Palomar || NEAT || — || align=right | 5.4 km || 
|-id=490 bgcolor=#E9E9E9
| 144490 ||  || — || March 13, 2004 || Palomar || NEAT || — || align=right | 3.6 km || 
|-id=491 bgcolor=#d6d6d6
| 144491 ||  || — || March 14, 2004 || Socorro || LINEAR || — || align=right | 7.6 km || 
|-id=492 bgcolor=#E9E9E9
| 144492 ||  || — || March 14, 2004 || Socorro || LINEAR || EUN || align=right | 2.8 km || 
|-id=493 bgcolor=#E9E9E9
| 144493 ||  || — || March 14, 2004 || Kitt Peak || Spacewatch || — || align=right | 1.3 km || 
|-id=494 bgcolor=#E9E9E9
| 144494 ||  || — || March 14, 2004 || Kitt Peak || Spacewatch || — || align=right | 2.4 km || 
|-id=495 bgcolor=#fefefe
| 144495 ||  || — || March 14, 2004 || Palomar || NEAT || — || align=right | 1.4 km || 
|-id=496 bgcolor=#E9E9E9
| 144496 Reingard ||  ||  || March 14, 2004 || Wildberg || R. Apitzsch || ADE || align=right | 3.3 km || 
|-id=497 bgcolor=#E9E9E9
| 144497 ||  || — || March 15, 2004 || Kitt Peak || Spacewatch || AGN || align=right | 1.6 km || 
|-id=498 bgcolor=#fefefe
| 144498 ||  || — || March 15, 2004 || Kitt Peak || Spacewatch || — || align=right | 1.1 km || 
|-id=499 bgcolor=#d6d6d6
| 144499 ||  || — || March 15, 2004 || Socorro || LINEAR || KOR || align=right | 2.5 km || 
|-id=500 bgcolor=#E9E9E9
| 144500 ||  || — || March 15, 2004 || Socorro || LINEAR || — || align=right | 3.2 km || 
|}

144501–144600 

|-bgcolor=#d6d6d6
| 144501 ||  || — || March 15, 2004 || Socorro || LINEAR || — || align=right | 4.7 km || 
|-id=502 bgcolor=#E9E9E9
| 144502 ||  || — || March 15, 2004 || Kitt Peak || Spacewatch || HEN || align=right | 1.6 km || 
|-id=503 bgcolor=#E9E9E9
| 144503 ||  || — || March 15, 2004 || Kitt Peak || Spacewatch || — || align=right | 2.8 km || 
|-id=504 bgcolor=#E9E9E9
| 144504 ||  || — || March 15, 2004 || Kitt Peak || Spacewatch || GEF || align=right | 1.9 km || 
|-id=505 bgcolor=#E9E9E9
| 144505 ||  || — || March 15, 2004 || Catalina || CSS || — || align=right | 2.3 km || 
|-id=506 bgcolor=#E9E9E9
| 144506 ||  || — || March 15, 2004 || Socorro || LINEAR || — || align=right | 1.4 km || 
|-id=507 bgcolor=#E9E9E9
| 144507 ||  || — || March 15, 2004 || Catalina || CSS || — || align=right | 2.6 km || 
|-id=508 bgcolor=#E9E9E9
| 144508 ||  || — || March 15, 2004 || Catalina || CSS || — || align=right | 5.2 km || 
|-id=509 bgcolor=#E9E9E9
| 144509 ||  || — || March 15, 2004 || Kitt Peak || Spacewatch || — || align=right | 4.5 km || 
|-id=510 bgcolor=#d6d6d6
| 144510 ||  || — || March 14, 2004 || Kitt Peak || Spacewatch || — || align=right | 3.1 km || 
|-id=511 bgcolor=#d6d6d6
| 144511 ||  || — || March 14, 2004 || Kitt Peak || Spacewatch || — || align=right | 4.3 km || 
|-id=512 bgcolor=#d6d6d6
| 144512 ||  || — || March 14, 2004 || Kitt Peak || Spacewatch || — || align=right | 5.8 km || 
|-id=513 bgcolor=#d6d6d6
| 144513 ||  || — || March 14, 2004 || Palomar || NEAT || 637 || align=right | 4.9 km || 
|-id=514 bgcolor=#d6d6d6
| 144514 ||  || — || March 14, 2004 || Palomar || NEAT || — || align=right | 5.0 km || 
|-id=515 bgcolor=#E9E9E9
| 144515 ||  || — || March 15, 2004 || Catalina || CSS || — || align=right | 3.2 km || 
|-id=516 bgcolor=#fefefe
| 144516 ||  || — || March 15, 2004 || Socorro || LINEAR || — || align=right | 1.6 km || 
|-id=517 bgcolor=#E9E9E9
| 144517 ||  || — || March 15, 2004 || Catalina || CSS || — || align=right | 3.5 km || 
|-id=518 bgcolor=#E9E9E9
| 144518 ||  || — || March 15, 2004 || Catalina || CSS || — || align=right | 4.0 km || 
|-id=519 bgcolor=#E9E9E9
| 144519 ||  || — || March 15, 2004 || Catalina || CSS || — || align=right | 4.1 km || 
|-id=520 bgcolor=#fefefe
| 144520 ||  || — || March 15, 2004 || Catalina || CSS || — || align=right | 1.1 km || 
|-id=521 bgcolor=#d6d6d6
| 144521 ||  || — || March 15, 2004 || Palomar || NEAT || EOS || align=right | 6.9 km || 
|-id=522 bgcolor=#E9E9E9
| 144522 ||  || — || March 15, 2004 || Catalina || CSS || HNS || align=right | 2.2 km || 
|-id=523 bgcolor=#E9E9E9
| 144523 ||  || — || March 15, 2004 || Catalina || CSS || — || align=right | 2.3 km || 
|-id=524 bgcolor=#E9E9E9
| 144524 ||  || — || March 15, 2004 || Palomar || NEAT || — || align=right | 4.6 km || 
|-id=525 bgcolor=#E9E9E9
| 144525 ||  || — || March 14, 2004 || Socorro || LINEAR || — || align=right | 2.6 km || 
|-id=526 bgcolor=#E9E9E9
| 144526 ||  || — || March 15, 2004 || Socorro || LINEAR || — || align=right | 2.7 km || 
|-id=527 bgcolor=#E9E9E9
| 144527 ||  || — || March 15, 2004 || Socorro || LINEAR || — || align=right | 3.9 km || 
|-id=528 bgcolor=#d6d6d6
| 144528 ||  || — || March 15, 2004 || Socorro || LINEAR || — || align=right | 5.4 km || 
|-id=529 bgcolor=#d6d6d6
| 144529 ||  || — || March 15, 2004 || Socorro || LINEAR || ALA || align=right | 6.6 km || 
|-id=530 bgcolor=#d6d6d6
| 144530 ||  || — || March 15, 2004 || Desert Eagle || W. K. Y. Yeung || — || align=right | 4.9 km || 
|-id=531 bgcolor=#E9E9E9
| 144531 ||  || — || March 15, 2004 || Kitt Peak || Spacewatch || — || align=right | 3.0 km || 
|-id=532 bgcolor=#d6d6d6
| 144532 ||  || — || March 13, 2004 || Palomar || NEAT || — || align=right | 6.7 km || 
|-id=533 bgcolor=#E9E9E9
| 144533 ||  || — || March 14, 2004 || Socorro || LINEAR || — || align=right | 3.3 km || 
|-id=534 bgcolor=#fefefe
| 144534 ||  || — || March 14, 2004 || Kitt Peak || Spacewatch || FLO || align=right | 1.6 km || 
|-id=535 bgcolor=#E9E9E9
| 144535 ||  || — || March 14, 2004 || Kitt Peak || Spacewatch || WIT || align=right | 1.7 km || 
|-id=536 bgcolor=#E9E9E9
| 144536 ||  || — || March 14, 2004 || Palomar || NEAT || — || align=right | 2.5 km || 
|-id=537 bgcolor=#E9E9E9
| 144537 ||  || — || March 14, 2004 || Kitt Peak || Spacewatch || — || align=right | 3.0 km || 
|-id=538 bgcolor=#fefefe
| 144538 ||  || — || March 15, 2004 || Socorro || LINEAR || — || align=right | 1.3 km || 
|-id=539 bgcolor=#E9E9E9
| 144539 ||  || — || March 15, 2004 || Socorro || LINEAR || — || align=right | 3.4 km || 
|-id=540 bgcolor=#fefefe
| 144540 ||  || — || March 15, 2004 || Kitt Peak || Spacewatch || NYS || align=right | 1.1 km || 
|-id=541 bgcolor=#d6d6d6
| 144541 ||  || — || March 15, 2004 || Socorro || LINEAR || — || align=right | 4.6 km || 
|-id=542 bgcolor=#d6d6d6
| 144542 ||  || — || March 15, 2004 || Socorro || LINEAR || NAE || align=right | 4.2 km || 
|-id=543 bgcolor=#d6d6d6
| 144543 ||  || — || March 15, 2004 || Socorro || LINEAR || — || align=right | 5.7 km || 
|-id=544 bgcolor=#fefefe
| 144544 ||  || — || March 15, 2004 || Catalina || CSS || NYS || align=right | 1.2 km || 
|-id=545 bgcolor=#E9E9E9
| 144545 ||  || — || March 14, 2004 || Socorro || LINEAR || MAR || align=right | 1.7 km || 
|-id=546 bgcolor=#E9E9E9
| 144546 ||  || — || March 15, 2004 || Kitt Peak || Spacewatch || — || align=right | 3.9 km || 
|-id=547 bgcolor=#E9E9E9
| 144547 ||  || — || March 15, 2004 || Kitt Peak || Spacewatch || — || align=right | 2.4 km || 
|-id=548 bgcolor=#d6d6d6
| 144548 ||  || — || March 15, 2004 || Kitt Peak || Spacewatch || — || align=right | 4.7 km || 
|-id=549 bgcolor=#d6d6d6
| 144549 ||  || — || March 15, 2004 || Socorro || LINEAR || EOS || align=right | 3.2 km || 
|-id=550 bgcolor=#E9E9E9
| 144550 ||  || — || March 9, 2004 || Palomar || NEAT || — || align=right | 4.3 km || 
|-id=551 bgcolor=#E9E9E9
| 144551 ||  || — || March 14, 2004 || Socorro || LINEAR || — || align=right | 1.6 km || 
|-id=552 bgcolor=#E9E9E9
| 144552 Jackiesue ||  ||  || March 19, 2004 || Antares || R. Holmes || — || align=right | 4.1 km || 
|-id=553 bgcolor=#E9E9E9
| 144553 ||  || — || March 23, 2004 || Emerald Lane || L. Ball || — || align=right | 3.6 km || 
|-id=554 bgcolor=#E9E9E9
| 144554 ||  || — || March 16, 2004 || Catalina || CSS || — || align=right | 4.5 km || 
|-id=555 bgcolor=#fefefe
| 144555 ||  || — || March 16, 2004 || Socorro || LINEAR || NYS || align=right | 1.0 km || 
|-id=556 bgcolor=#d6d6d6
| 144556 ||  || — || March 16, 2004 || Socorro || LINEAR || ALA || align=right | 4.8 km || 
|-id=557 bgcolor=#E9E9E9
| 144557 ||  || — || March 16, 2004 || Socorro || LINEAR || — || align=right | 4.9 km || 
|-id=558 bgcolor=#d6d6d6
| 144558 ||  || — || March 16, 2004 || Kitt Peak || Spacewatch || — || align=right | 3.3 km || 
|-id=559 bgcolor=#E9E9E9
| 144559 ||  || — || March 16, 2004 || Campo Imperatore || CINEOS || — || align=right | 3.7 km || 
|-id=560 bgcolor=#d6d6d6
| 144560 ||  || — || March 16, 2004 || Catalina || CSS || EOS || align=right | 3.2 km || 
|-id=561 bgcolor=#E9E9E9
| 144561 ||  || — || March 16, 2004 || Socorro || LINEAR || — || align=right | 4.0 km || 
|-id=562 bgcolor=#E9E9E9
| 144562 ||  || — || March 16, 2004 || Catalina || CSS || — || align=right | 1.6 km || 
|-id=563 bgcolor=#fefefe
| 144563 ||  || — || March 16, 2004 || Catalina || CSS || FLO || align=right | 2.0 km || 
|-id=564 bgcolor=#fefefe
| 144564 ||  || — || March 16, 2004 || Catalina || CSS || Vslow || align=right | 1.6 km || 
|-id=565 bgcolor=#E9E9E9
| 144565 ||  || — || March 16, 2004 || Catalina || CSS || DOR || align=right | 5.2 km || 
|-id=566 bgcolor=#E9E9E9
| 144566 ||  || — || March 16, 2004 || Socorro || LINEAR || NEM || align=right | 4.0 km || 
|-id=567 bgcolor=#E9E9E9
| 144567 ||  || — || March 16, 2004 || Kitt Peak || Spacewatch || — || align=right | 3.0 km || 
|-id=568 bgcolor=#d6d6d6
| 144568 ||  || — || March 16, 2004 || Catalina || CSS || — || align=right | 3.9 km || 
|-id=569 bgcolor=#d6d6d6
| 144569 ||  || — || March 16, 2004 || Catalina || CSS || — || align=right | 5.3 km || 
|-id=570 bgcolor=#E9E9E9
| 144570 ||  || — || March 16, 2004 || Valmeca || Valmeca Obs. || — || align=right | 3.4 km || 
|-id=571 bgcolor=#E9E9E9
| 144571 ||  || — || March 16, 2004 || Socorro || LINEAR || — || align=right | 1.6 km || 
|-id=572 bgcolor=#E9E9E9
| 144572 ||  || — || March 16, 2004 || Socorro || LINEAR || — || align=right | 2.8 km || 
|-id=573 bgcolor=#d6d6d6
| 144573 ||  || — || March 16, 2004 || Socorro || LINEAR || HYG || align=right | 5.5 km || 
|-id=574 bgcolor=#d6d6d6
| 144574 ||  || — || March 16, 2004 || Campo Imperatore || CINEOS || — || align=right | 2.7 km || 
|-id=575 bgcolor=#d6d6d6
| 144575 ||  || — || March 17, 2004 || Socorro || LINEAR || HYG || align=right | 5.7 km || 
|-id=576 bgcolor=#E9E9E9
| 144576 ||  || — || March 17, 2004 || Kitt Peak || Spacewatch || — || align=right | 1.4 km || 
|-id=577 bgcolor=#d6d6d6
| 144577 ||  || — || March 17, 2004 || Kitt Peak || Spacewatch || CHA || align=right | 2.2 km || 
|-id=578 bgcolor=#E9E9E9
| 144578 ||  || — || March 18, 2004 || Socorro || LINEAR || — || align=right | 3.8 km || 
|-id=579 bgcolor=#E9E9E9
| 144579 ||  || — || March 30, 2004 || Kitt Peak || Spacewatch || — || align=right | 2.2 km || 
|-id=580 bgcolor=#fefefe
| 144580 ||  || — || March 16, 2004 || Catalina || CSS || — || align=right | 1.2 km || 
|-id=581 bgcolor=#fefefe
| 144581 ||  || — || March 16, 2004 || Socorro || LINEAR || MAS || align=right | 1.2 km || 
|-id=582 bgcolor=#fefefe
| 144582 ||  || — || March 16, 2004 || Kitt Peak || Spacewatch || — || align=right | 1.3 km || 
|-id=583 bgcolor=#d6d6d6
| 144583 ||  || — || March 16, 2004 || Socorro || LINEAR || — || align=right | 4.3 km || 
|-id=584 bgcolor=#d6d6d6
| 144584 ||  || — || March 16, 2004 || Socorro || LINEAR || ALA || align=right | 7.7 km || 
|-id=585 bgcolor=#E9E9E9
| 144585 ||  || — || March 17, 2004 || Socorro || LINEAR || MRX || align=right | 1.9 km || 
|-id=586 bgcolor=#E9E9E9
| 144586 ||  || — || March 17, 2004 || Socorro || LINEAR || — || align=right | 2.9 km || 
|-id=587 bgcolor=#E9E9E9
| 144587 ||  || — || March 17, 2004 || Socorro || LINEAR || — || align=right | 2.8 km || 
|-id=588 bgcolor=#d6d6d6
| 144588 ||  || — || March 17, 2004 || Socorro || LINEAR || — || align=right | 3.6 km || 
|-id=589 bgcolor=#E9E9E9
| 144589 ||  || — || March 18, 2004 || Socorro || LINEAR || — || align=right | 4.3 km || 
|-id=590 bgcolor=#fefefe
| 144590 ||  || — || March 18, 2004 || Socorro || LINEAR || — || align=right | 2.7 km || 
|-id=591 bgcolor=#E9E9E9
| 144591 ||  || — || March 16, 2004 || Kitt Peak || Spacewatch || — || align=right | 1.8 km || 
|-id=592 bgcolor=#E9E9E9
| 144592 ||  || — || March 17, 2004 || Kitt Peak || Spacewatch || — || align=right | 3.6 km || 
|-id=593 bgcolor=#E9E9E9
| 144593 ||  || — || March 16, 2004 || Socorro || LINEAR || — || align=right | 2.5 km || 
|-id=594 bgcolor=#fefefe
| 144594 ||  || — || March 16, 2004 || Socorro || LINEAR || — || align=right | 1.5 km || 
|-id=595 bgcolor=#fefefe
| 144595 ||  || — || March 16, 2004 || Socorro || LINEAR || — || align=right | 1.2 km || 
|-id=596 bgcolor=#fefefe
| 144596 ||  || — || March 16, 2004 || Socorro || LINEAR || — || align=right | 1.5 km || 
|-id=597 bgcolor=#d6d6d6
| 144597 ||  || — || March 16, 2004 || Socorro || LINEAR || VER || align=right | 6.1 km || 
|-id=598 bgcolor=#d6d6d6
| 144598 ||  || — || March 16, 2004 || Socorro || LINEAR || — || align=right | 6.0 km || 
|-id=599 bgcolor=#E9E9E9
| 144599 ||  || — || March 16, 2004 || Socorro || LINEAR || HNA || align=right | 4.3 km || 
|-id=600 bgcolor=#E9E9E9
| 144600 ||  || — || March 16, 2004 || Socorro || LINEAR || — || align=right | 1.8 km || 
|}

144601–144700 

|-bgcolor=#E9E9E9
| 144601 ||  || — || March 17, 2004 || Kitt Peak || Spacewatch || — || align=right | 2.0 km || 
|-id=602 bgcolor=#E9E9E9
| 144602 ||  || — || March 18, 2004 || Socorro || LINEAR || — || align=right | 1.5 km || 
|-id=603 bgcolor=#E9E9E9
| 144603 ||  || — || March 18, 2004 || Socorro || LINEAR || MAR || align=right | 1.8 km || 
|-id=604 bgcolor=#E9E9E9
| 144604 ||  || — || March 18, 2004 || Socorro || LINEAR || — || align=right | 1.6 km || 
|-id=605 bgcolor=#E9E9E9
| 144605 ||  || — || March 18, 2004 || Socorro || LINEAR || — || align=right | 1.7 km || 
|-id=606 bgcolor=#d6d6d6
| 144606 ||  || — || March 18, 2004 || Socorro || LINEAR || — || align=right | 6.3 km || 
|-id=607 bgcolor=#E9E9E9
| 144607 ||  || — || March 19, 2004 || Socorro || LINEAR || — || align=right | 3.2 km || 
|-id=608 bgcolor=#E9E9E9
| 144608 ||  || — || March 19, 2004 || Socorro || LINEAR || MAR || align=right | 1.9 km || 
|-id=609 bgcolor=#E9E9E9
| 144609 ||  || — || March 19, 2004 || Socorro || LINEAR || — || align=right | 2.5 km || 
|-id=610 bgcolor=#E9E9E9
| 144610 ||  || — || March 19, 2004 || Socorro || LINEAR || — || align=right | 3.1 km || 
|-id=611 bgcolor=#fefefe
| 144611 ||  || — || March 19, 2004 || Socorro || LINEAR || NYS || align=right | 1.1 km || 
|-id=612 bgcolor=#E9E9E9
| 144612 ||  || — || March 16, 2004 || Socorro || LINEAR || — || align=right | 3.9 km || 
|-id=613 bgcolor=#d6d6d6
| 144613 ||  || — || March 17, 2004 || Socorro || LINEAR || — || align=right | 3.9 km || 
|-id=614 bgcolor=#d6d6d6
| 144614 ||  || — || March 19, 2004 || Socorro || LINEAR || K-2 || align=right | 2.7 km || 
|-id=615 bgcolor=#E9E9E9
| 144615 ||  || — || March 19, 2004 || Socorro || LINEAR || MIS || align=right | 5.1 km || 
|-id=616 bgcolor=#E9E9E9
| 144616 ||  || — || March 19, 2004 || Socorro || LINEAR || — || align=right | 1.5 km || 
|-id=617 bgcolor=#E9E9E9
| 144617 ||  || — || March 19, 2004 || Socorro || LINEAR || — || align=right | 3.3 km || 
|-id=618 bgcolor=#E9E9E9
| 144618 ||  || — || March 19, 2004 || Socorro || LINEAR || — || align=right | 4.0 km || 
|-id=619 bgcolor=#E9E9E9
| 144619 ||  || — || March 19, 2004 || Socorro || LINEAR || MIS || align=right | 4.1 km || 
|-id=620 bgcolor=#d6d6d6
| 144620 ||  || — || March 19, 2004 || Socorro || LINEAR || — || align=right | 4.0 km || 
|-id=621 bgcolor=#E9E9E9
| 144621 ||  || — || March 20, 2004 || Socorro || LINEAR || — || align=right | 2.4 km || 
|-id=622 bgcolor=#E9E9E9
| 144622 ||  || — || March 20, 2004 || Socorro || LINEAR || PAD || align=right | 3.1 km || 
|-id=623 bgcolor=#E9E9E9
| 144623 ||  || — || March 21, 2004 || Kitt Peak || Spacewatch || HEN || align=right | 1.8 km || 
|-id=624 bgcolor=#d6d6d6
| 144624 ||  || — || March 21, 2004 || Kitt Peak || Spacewatch || — || align=right | 5.3 km || 
|-id=625 bgcolor=#d6d6d6
| 144625 ||  || — || March 16, 2004 || Kitt Peak || Spacewatch || — || align=right | 3.9 km || 
|-id=626 bgcolor=#d6d6d6
| 144626 ||  || — || March 16, 2004 || Kitt Peak || Spacewatch || — || align=right | 5.5 km || 
|-id=627 bgcolor=#E9E9E9
| 144627 ||  || — || March 17, 2004 || Kitt Peak || Spacewatch || MIS || align=right | 3.1 km || 
|-id=628 bgcolor=#fefefe
| 144628 ||  || — || March 18, 2004 || Socorro || LINEAR || EUT || align=right data-sort-value="0.90" | 900 m || 
|-id=629 bgcolor=#d6d6d6
| 144629 ||  || — || March 18, 2004 || Socorro || LINEAR || — || align=right | 3.0 km || 
|-id=630 bgcolor=#E9E9E9
| 144630 ||  || — || March 18, 2004 || Socorro || LINEAR || — || align=right | 2.1 km || 
|-id=631 bgcolor=#E9E9E9
| 144631 ||  || — || March 19, 2004 || Socorro || LINEAR || — || align=right | 1.5 km || 
|-id=632 bgcolor=#E9E9E9
| 144632 ||  || — || March 19, 2004 || Kitt Peak || Spacewatch || — || align=right | 2.2 km || 
|-id=633 bgcolor=#E9E9E9
| 144633 Georgecarroll ||  ||  || March 21, 2004 || Stony Ridge || Stony Ridge Obs. || EUN || align=right | 3.4 km || 
|-id=634 bgcolor=#d6d6d6
| 144634 ||  || — || March 22, 2004 || Socorro || LINEAR || — || align=right | 4.4 km || 
|-id=635 bgcolor=#E9E9E9
| 144635 ||  || — || March 18, 2004 || Kitt Peak || Spacewatch || MAR || align=right | 2.1 km || 
|-id=636 bgcolor=#E9E9E9
| 144636 ||  || — || March 20, 2004 || Kitt Peak || Spacewatch || NEM || align=right | 3.3 km || 
|-id=637 bgcolor=#E9E9E9
| 144637 ||  || — || March 20, 2004 || Siding Spring || SSS || — || align=right | 2.9 km || 
|-id=638 bgcolor=#d6d6d6
| 144638 ||  || — || March 19, 2004 || Socorro || LINEAR || — || align=right | 4.5 km || 
|-id=639 bgcolor=#E9E9E9
| 144639 ||  || — || March 20, 2004 || Socorro || LINEAR || — || align=right | 4.0 km || 
|-id=640 bgcolor=#E9E9E9
| 144640 ||  || — || March 22, 2004 || Socorro || LINEAR || PAD || align=right | 3.8 km || 
|-id=641 bgcolor=#fefefe
| 144641 ||  || — || March 23, 2004 || Kitt Peak || Spacewatch || EUT || align=right | 1.1 km || 
|-id=642 bgcolor=#E9E9E9
| 144642 ||  || — || March 23, 2004 || Socorro || LINEAR || — || align=right | 2.2 km || 
|-id=643 bgcolor=#E9E9E9
| 144643 ||  || — || March 23, 2004 || Socorro || LINEAR || — || align=right | 4.8 km || 
|-id=644 bgcolor=#d6d6d6
| 144644 ||  || — || March 22, 2004 || Socorro || LINEAR || — || align=right | 3.4 km || 
|-id=645 bgcolor=#E9E9E9
| 144645 ||  || — || March 23, 2004 || Socorro || LINEAR || — || align=right | 2.5 km || 
|-id=646 bgcolor=#E9E9E9
| 144646 ||  || — || March 19, 2004 || Socorro || LINEAR || — || align=right | 4.6 km || 
|-id=647 bgcolor=#fefefe
| 144647 ||  || — || March 23, 2004 || Kitt Peak || Spacewatch || — || align=right | 1.2 km || 
|-id=648 bgcolor=#d6d6d6
| 144648 ||  || — || March 24, 2004 || Siding Spring || SSS || EUP || align=right | 6.3 km || 
|-id=649 bgcolor=#E9E9E9
| 144649 ||  || — || March 24, 2004 || Siding Spring || SSS || EUN || align=right | 2.5 km || 
|-id=650 bgcolor=#E9E9E9
| 144650 ||  || — || March 25, 2004 || Socorro || LINEAR || — || align=right | 2.6 km || 
|-id=651 bgcolor=#E9E9E9
| 144651 ||  || — || March 26, 2004 || Kitt Peak || Spacewatch || — || align=right | 1.4 km || 
|-id=652 bgcolor=#d6d6d6
| 144652 ||  || — || March 26, 2004 || Kitt Peak || Spacewatch || — || align=right | 6.0 km || 
|-id=653 bgcolor=#E9E9E9
| 144653 ||  || — || March 23, 2004 || Socorro || LINEAR || — || align=right | 2.5 km || 
|-id=654 bgcolor=#E9E9E9
| 144654 ||  || — || March 23, 2004 || Kitt Peak || Spacewatch || WIT || align=right | 1.6 km || 
|-id=655 bgcolor=#E9E9E9
| 144655 ||  || — || March 24, 2004 || Anderson Mesa || LONEOS || — || align=right | 2.8 km || 
|-id=656 bgcolor=#d6d6d6
| 144656 ||  || — || March 25, 2004 || Anderson Mesa || LONEOS || 615 || align=right | 2.1 km || 
|-id=657 bgcolor=#fefefe
| 144657 ||  || — || March 26, 2004 || Kitt Peak || Spacewatch || — || align=right | 1.0 km || 
|-id=658 bgcolor=#d6d6d6
| 144658 ||  || — || March 23, 2004 || Socorro || LINEAR || EOS || align=right | 3.7 km || 
|-id=659 bgcolor=#d6d6d6
| 144659 ||  || — || March 23, 2004 || Socorro || LINEAR || TIR || align=right | 4.3 km || 
|-id=660 bgcolor=#E9E9E9
| 144660 ||  || — || March 27, 2004 || Socorro || LINEAR || — || align=right | 4.2 km || 
|-id=661 bgcolor=#E9E9E9
| 144661 ||  || — || March 22, 2004 || Socorro || LINEAR || HOF || align=right | 5.0 km || 
|-id=662 bgcolor=#fefefe
| 144662 ||  || — || March 23, 2004 || Socorro || LINEAR || — || align=right | 1.8 km || 
|-id=663 bgcolor=#fefefe
| 144663 ||  || — || March 24, 2004 || Anderson Mesa || LONEOS || — || align=right | 2.1 km || 
|-id=664 bgcolor=#d6d6d6
| 144664 ||  || — || March 26, 2004 || Socorro || LINEAR || — || align=right | 4.9 km || 
|-id=665 bgcolor=#d6d6d6
| 144665 ||  || — || March 27, 2004 || Socorro || LINEAR || EOS || align=right | 2.7 km || 
|-id=666 bgcolor=#E9E9E9
| 144666 ||  || — || March 27, 2004 || Socorro || LINEAR || — || align=right | 1.6 km || 
|-id=667 bgcolor=#d6d6d6
| 144667 ||  || — || March 27, 2004 || Socorro || LINEAR || THM || align=right | 4.1 km || 
|-id=668 bgcolor=#E9E9E9
| 144668 ||  || — || March 27, 2004 || Catalina || CSS || MIS || align=right | 4.7 km || 
|-id=669 bgcolor=#fefefe
| 144669 ||  || — || March 16, 2004 || Socorro || LINEAR || — || align=right | 3.5 km || 
|-id=670 bgcolor=#E9E9E9
| 144670 ||  || — || March 21, 2004 || Kitt Peak || Spacewatch || — || align=right | 3.5 km || 
|-id=671 bgcolor=#d6d6d6
| 144671 ||  || — || March 22, 2004 || Anderson Mesa || LONEOS || — || align=right | 7.8 km || 
|-id=672 bgcolor=#d6d6d6
| 144672 ||  || — || March 22, 2004 || Anderson Mesa || LONEOS || EUP || align=right | 8.1 km || 
|-id=673 bgcolor=#d6d6d6
| 144673 ||  || — || March 22, 2004 || Anderson Mesa || LONEOS || — || align=right | 8.0 km || 
|-id=674 bgcolor=#E9E9E9
| 144674 ||  || — || March 22, 2004 || Anderson Mesa || LONEOS || — || align=right | 1.6 km || 
|-id=675 bgcolor=#d6d6d6
| 144675 ||  || — || March 23, 2004 || Socorro || LINEAR || URS || align=right | 5.9 km || 
|-id=676 bgcolor=#d6d6d6
| 144676 ||  || — || March 26, 2004 || Socorro || LINEAR || — || align=right | 6.4 km || 
|-id=677 bgcolor=#E9E9E9
| 144677 ||  || — || March 27, 2004 || Anderson Mesa || LONEOS || ADE || align=right | 3.6 km || 
|-id=678 bgcolor=#fefefe
| 144678 ||  || — || March 29, 2004 || Kitt Peak || Spacewatch || — || align=right | 3.2 km || 
|-id=679 bgcolor=#E9E9E9
| 144679 ||  || — || March 27, 2004 || Anderson Mesa || LONEOS || — || align=right | 3.0 km || 
|-id=680 bgcolor=#E9E9E9
| 144680 ||  || — || March 27, 2004 || Anderson Mesa || LONEOS || MRX || align=right | 1.7 km || 
|-id=681 bgcolor=#fefefe
| 144681 ||  || — || March 27, 2004 || Socorro || LINEAR || NYS || align=right | 1.3 km || 
|-id=682 bgcolor=#E9E9E9
| 144682 ||  || — || March 27, 2004 || Socorro || LINEAR || — || align=right | 3.0 km || 
|-id=683 bgcolor=#d6d6d6
| 144683 ||  || — || March 27, 2004 || Socorro || LINEAR || HYG || align=right | 4.9 km || 
|-id=684 bgcolor=#E9E9E9
| 144684 ||  || — || March 27, 2004 || Socorro || LINEAR || — || align=right | 5.1 km || 
|-id=685 bgcolor=#d6d6d6
| 144685 ||  || — || March 29, 2004 || Catalina || CSS || BRA || align=right | 3.1 km || 
|-id=686 bgcolor=#d6d6d6
| 144686 ||  || — || March 29, 2004 || Catalina || CSS || — || align=right | 8.2 km || 
|-id=687 bgcolor=#E9E9E9
| 144687 ||  || — || March 29, 2004 || Socorro || LINEAR || MAR || align=right | 2.1 km || 
|-id=688 bgcolor=#E9E9E9
| 144688 ||  || — || March 29, 2004 || Kitt Peak || DLS || — || align=right | 2.5 km || 
|-id=689 bgcolor=#d6d6d6
| 144689 ||  || — || March 31, 2004 || Socorro || LINEAR || THM || align=right | 6.8 km || 
|-id=690 bgcolor=#d6d6d6
| 144690 ||  || — || March 16, 2004 || Palomar || NEAT || — || align=right | 7.0 km || 
|-id=691 bgcolor=#d6d6d6
| 144691 ||  || — || March 17, 2004 || Socorro || LINEAR || — || align=right | 4.9 km || 
|-id=692 bgcolor=#E9E9E9
| 144692 Katemary || 2004 GC ||  || April 9, 2004 || Wrightwood || J. W. Young || — || align=right | 2.2 km || 
|-id=693 bgcolor=#E9E9E9
| 144693 || 2004 GF || — || April 8, 2004 || Siding Spring || SSS || — || align=right | 2.5 km || 
|-id=694 bgcolor=#d6d6d6
| 144694 ||  || — || April 10, 2004 || Catalina || CSS || EOS || align=right | 3.5 km || 
|-id=695 bgcolor=#E9E9E9
| 144695 ||  || — || April 8, 2004 || Siding Spring || SSS || — || align=right | 7.0 km || 
|-id=696 bgcolor=#E9E9E9
| 144696 ||  || — || April 11, 2004 || Palomar || NEAT || — || align=right | 2.1 km || 
|-id=697 bgcolor=#E9E9E9
| 144697 ||  || — || April 12, 2004 || Kitt Peak || Spacewatch || — || align=right | 2.0 km || 
|-id=698 bgcolor=#E9E9E9
| 144698 ||  || — || April 8, 2004 || Palomar || NEAT || — || align=right | 2.9 km || 
|-id=699 bgcolor=#E9E9E9
| 144699 ||  || — || April 12, 2004 || Siding Spring || SSS || — || align=right | 4.8 km || 
|-id=700 bgcolor=#d6d6d6
| 144700 ||  || — || April 12, 2004 || Kitt Peak || Spacewatch || — || align=right | 4.1 km || 
|}

144701–144800 

|-bgcolor=#E9E9E9
| 144701 ||  || — || April 13, 2004 || Catalina || CSS || RAF || align=right | 3.8 km || 
|-id=702 bgcolor=#E9E9E9
| 144702 ||  || — || April 9, 2004 || Palomar || NEAT || — || align=right | 5.0 km || 
|-id=703 bgcolor=#E9E9E9
| 144703 ||  || — || April 9, 2004 || Siding Spring || SSS || — || align=right | 3.1 km || 
|-id=704 bgcolor=#E9E9E9
| 144704 ||  || — || April 10, 2004 || Palomar || NEAT || JUN || align=right | 2.0 km || 
|-id=705 bgcolor=#E9E9E9
| 144705 ||  || — || April 12, 2004 || Catalina || CSS || — || align=right | 4.5 km || 
|-id=706 bgcolor=#E9E9E9
| 144706 ||  || — || April 12, 2004 || Palomar || NEAT || INO || align=right | 2.3 km || 
|-id=707 bgcolor=#d6d6d6
| 144707 ||  || — || April 12, 2004 || Catalina || CSS || — || align=right | 5.8 km || 
|-id=708 bgcolor=#d6d6d6
| 144708 ||  || — || April 13, 2004 || Catalina || CSS || — || align=right | 4.1 km || 
|-id=709 bgcolor=#E9E9E9
| 144709 ||  || — || April 11, 2004 || Palomar || NEAT || — || align=right | 2.4 km || 
|-id=710 bgcolor=#E9E9E9
| 144710 ||  || — || April 11, 2004 || Palomar || NEAT || — || align=right | 2.7 km || 
|-id=711 bgcolor=#E9E9E9
| 144711 ||  || — || April 12, 2004 || Catalina || CSS || — || align=right | 4.5 km || 
|-id=712 bgcolor=#d6d6d6
| 144712 ||  || — || April 12, 2004 || Palomar || NEAT || — || align=right | 2.8 km || 
|-id=713 bgcolor=#E9E9E9
| 144713 ||  || — || April 12, 2004 || Kitt Peak || Spacewatch || — || align=right | 1.1 km || 
|-id=714 bgcolor=#E9E9E9
| 144714 ||  || — || April 13, 2004 || Catalina || CSS || GEF || align=right | 2.5 km || 
|-id=715 bgcolor=#d6d6d6
| 144715 ||  || — || April 14, 2004 || Anderson Mesa || LONEOS || — || align=right | 3.7 km || 
|-id=716 bgcolor=#d6d6d6
| 144716 Scotttucker ||  ||  || April 13, 2004 || Goodricke-Pigott || V. Reddy || EOS || align=right | 3.6 km || 
|-id=717 bgcolor=#d6d6d6
| 144717 ||  || — || April 12, 2004 || Palomar || NEAT || — || align=right | 4.4 km || 
|-id=718 bgcolor=#E9E9E9
| 144718 ||  || — || April 12, 2004 || Anderson Mesa || LONEOS || — || align=right | 1.8 km || 
|-id=719 bgcolor=#d6d6d6
| 144719 ||  || — || April 13, 2004 || Kitt Peak || Spacewatch || — || align=right | 3.1 km || 
|-id=720 bgcolor=#E9E9E9
| 144720 ||  || — || April 12, 2004 || Palomar || NEAT || — || align=right | 4.5 km || 
|-id=721 bgcolor=#d6d6d6
| 144721 ||  || — || April 12, 2004 || Palomar || NEAT || — || align=right | 5.9 km || 
|-id=722 bgcolor=#E9E9E9
| 144722 ||  || — || April 13, 2004 || Palomar || NEAT || MAR || align=right | 2.8 km || 
|-id=723 bgcolor=#E9E9E9
| 144723 ||  || — || April 13, 2004 || Kitt Peak || Spacewatch || — || align=right | 2.2 km || 
|-id=724 bgcolor=#d6d6d6
| 144724 ||  || — || April 13, 2004 || Palomar || NEAT || TIR || align=right | 4.8 km || 
|-id=725 bgcolor=#E9E9E9
| 144725 ||  || — || April 13, 2004 || Kitt Peak || Spacewatch || — || align=right | 2.6 km || 
|-id=726 bgcolor=#d6d6d6
| 144726 ||  || — || April 13, 2004 || Palomar || NEAT || — || align=right | 5.1 km || 
|-id=727 bgcolor=#d6d6d6
| 144727 ||  || — || April 13, 2004 || Palomar || NEAT || — || align=right | 5.0 km || 
|-id=728 bgcolor=#d6d6d6
| 144728 ||  || — || April 14, 2004 || Anderson Mesa || LONEOS || — || align=right | 4.2 km || 
|-id=729 bgcolor=#E9E9E9
| 144729 ||  || — || April 14, 2004 || Anderson Mesa || LONEOS || — || align=right | 4.8 km || 
|-id=730 bgcolor=#d6d6d6
| 144730 ||  || — || April 15, 2004 || Anderson Mesa || LONEOS || — || align=right | 5.0 km || 
|-id=731 bgcolor=#E9E9E9
| 144731 ||  || — || April 15, 2004 || Anderson Mesa || LONEOS || GEF || align=right | 1.8 km || 
|-id=732 bgcolor=#d6d6d6
| 144732 ||  || — || April 12, 2004 || Anderson Mesa || LONEOS || THM || align=right | 3.7 km || 
|-id=733 bgcolor=#E9E9E9
| 144733 ||  || — || April 12, 2004 || Palomar || NEAT || — || align=right | 3.7 km || 
|-id=734 bgcolor=#d6d6d6
| 144734 ||  || — || April 13, 2004 || Kitt Peak || Spacewatch || KOR || align=right | 2.2 km || 
|-id=735 bgcolor=#E9E9E9
| 144735 ||  || — || April 14, 2004 || Kitt Peak || Spacewatch || — || align=right | 3.4 km || 
|-id=736 bgcolor=#E9E9E9
| 144736 ||  || — || April 14, 2004 || Kitt Peak || Spacewatch || — || align=right | 4.6 km || 
|-id=737 bgcolor=#E9E9E9
| 144737 ||  || — || April 15, 2004 || Socorro || LINEAR || — || align=right | 4.8 km || 
|-id=738 bgcolor=#d6d6d6
| 144738 ||  || — || April 12, 2004 || Kitt Peak || Spacewatch || — || align=right | 3.2 km || 
|-id=739 bgcolor=#d6d6d6
| 144739 ||  || — || April 12, 2004 || Kitt Peak || Spacewatch || — || align=right | 2.8 km || 
|-id=740 bgcolor=#d6d6d6
| 144740 ||  || — || April 13, 2004 || Kitt Peak || Spacewatch || — || align=right | 4.7 km || 
|-id=741 bgcolor=#d6d6d6
| 144741 ||  || — || April 12, 2004 || Anderson Mesa || LONEOS || — || align=right | 4.1 km || 
|-id=742 bgcolor=#d6d6d6
| 144742 ||  || — || April 15, 2004 || Anderson Mesa || LONEOS || — || align=right | 3.9 km || 
|-id=743 bgcolor=#d6d6d6
| 144743 ||  || — || April 15, 2004 || Anderson Mesa || LONEOS || — || align=right | 4.8 km || 
|-id=744 bgcolor=#d6d6d6
| 144744 ||  || — || April 13, 2004 || Kitt Peak || Spacewatch || — || align=right | 3.7 km || 
|-id=745 bgcolor=#E9E9E9
| 144745 ||  || — || April 13, 2004 || Kitt Peak || Spacewatch || — || align=right | 2.4 km || 
|-id=746 bgcolor=#E9E9E9
| 144746 ||  || — || April 13, 2004 || Kitt Peak || Spacewatch || — || align=right | 2.6 km || 
|-id=747 bgcolor=#fefefe
| 144747 ||  || — || April 15, 2004 || Palomar || NEAT || — || align=right | 1.6 km || 
|-id=748 bgcolor=#E9E9E9
| 144748 ||  || — || April 13, 2004 || Kitt Peak || Spacewatch || — || align=right | 1.4 km || 
|-id=749 bgcolor=#d6d6d6
| 144749 ||  || — || April 14, 2004 || Kitt Peak || Spacewatch || KOR || align=right | 2.1 km || 
|-id=750 bgcolor=#d6d6d6
| 144750 ||  || — || April 15, 2004 || Socorro || LINEAR || — || align=right | 5.4 km || 
|-id=751 bgcolor=#E9E9E9
| 144751 ||  || — || April 13, 2004 || Palomar || NEAT || — || align=right | 3.2 km || 
|-id=752 bgcolor=#d6d6d6
| 144752 Plunge || 2004 HK ||  || April 16, 2004 || Moletai || K. Černis, J. Zdanavičius || — || align=right | 4.2 km || 
|-id=753 bgcolor=#FA8072
| 144753 ||  || — || April 16, 2004 || Socorro || LINEAR || — || align=right | 2.5 km || 
|-id=754 bgcolor=#fefefe
| 144754 ||  || — || April 16, 2004 || Kitt Peak || Spacewatch || — || align=right | 1.2 km || 
|-id=755 bgcolor=#d6d6d6
| 144755 ||  || — || April 16, 2004 || Siding Spring || SSS || URS || align=right | 7.2 km || 
|-id=756 bgcolor=#E9E9E9
| 144756 ||  || — || April 16, 2004 || Palomar || NEAT || — || align=right | 2.3 km || 
|-id=757 bgcolor=#fefefe
| 144757 ||  || — || April 17, 2004 || Socorro || LINEAR || — || align=right | 1.5 km || 
|-id=758 bgcolor=#E9E9E9
| 144758 ||  || — || April 19, 2004 || Socorro || LINEAR || — || align=right | 3.6 km || 
|-id=759 bgcolor=#fefefe
| 144759 ||  || — || April 17, 2004 || Socorro || LINEAR || — || align=right | 1.6 km || 
|-id=760 bgcolor=#E9E9E9
| 144760 ||  || — || April 17, 2004 || Socorro || LINEAR || — || align=right | 4.3 km || 
|-id=761 bgcolor=#E9E9E9
| 144761 ||  || — || April 17, 2004 || Socorro || LINEAR || — || align=right | 2.3 km || 
|-id=762 bgcolor=#E9E9E9
| 144762 ||  || — || April 17, 2004 || Socorro || LINEAR || — || align=right | 3.6 km || 
|-id=763 bgcolor=#d6d6d6
| 144763 ||  || — || April 19, 2004 || Socorro || LINEAR || — || align=right | 4.5 km || 
|-id=764 bgcolor=#d6d6d6
| 144764 ||  || — || April 16, 2004 || Socorro || LINEAR || NAE || align=right | 5.9 km || 
|-id=765 bgcolor=#E9E9E9
| 144765 ||  || — || April 16, 2004 || Socorro || LINEAR || — || align=right | 2.1 km || 
|-id=766 bgcolor=#d6d6d6
| 144766 ||  || — || April 17, 2004 || Socorro || LINEAR || — || align=right | 3.4 km || 
|-id=767 bgcolor=#d6d6d6
| 144767 ||  || — || April 20, 2004 || Kitt Peak || Spacewatch || — || align=right | 3.3 km || 
|-id=768 bgcolor=#E9E9E9
| 144768 ||  || — || April 20, 2004 || Kitt Peak || Spacewatch || MAR || align=right | 2.7 km || 
|-id=769 bgcolor=#d6d6d6
| 144769 Zachariassen ||  ||  || April 19, 2004 || Jarnac || T. Glinos, D. H. Levy || — || align=right | 4.0 km || 
|-id=770 bgcolor=#d6d6d6
| 144770 ||  || — || April 16, 2004 || Kitt Peak || Spacewatch || KOR || align=right | 2.2 km || 
|-id=771 bgcolor=#E9E9E9
| 144771 ||  || — || April 16, 2004 || Kitt Peak || Spacewatch || AGN || align=right | 1.8 km || 
|-id=772 bgcolor=#d6d6d6
| 144772 ||  || — || April 19, 2004 || Socorro || LINEAR || — || align=right | 4.6 km || 
|-id=773 bgcolor=#E9E9E9
| 144773 ||  || — || April 19, 2004 || Socorro || LINEAR || — || align=right | 2.8 km || 
|-id=774 bgcolor=#E9E9E9
| 144774 ||  || — || April 19, 2004 || Socorro || LINEAR || — || align=right | 2.3 km || 
|-id=775 bgcolor=#d6d6d6
| 144775 ||  || — || April 19, 2004 || Socorro || LINEAR || — || align=right | 5.0 km || 
|-id=776 bgcolor=#E9E9E9
| 144776 ||  || — || April 20, 2004 || Socorro || LINEAR || ADE || align=right | 3.8 km || 
|-id=777 bgcolor=#d6d6d6
| 144777 ||  || — || April 20, 2004 || Socorro || LINEAR || — || align=right | 4.2 km || 
|-id=778 bgcolor=#d6d6d6
| 144778 ||  || — || April 20, 2004 || Socorro || LINEAR || — || align=right | 5.8 km || 
|-id=779 bgcolor=#E9E9E9
| 144779 ||  || — || April 20, 2004 || Socorro || LINEAR || — || align=right | 3.6 km || 
|-id=780 bgcolor=#d6d6d6
| 144780 ||  || — || April 21, 2004 || Kitt Peak || Spacewatch || — || align=right | 4.1 km || 
|-id=781 bgcolor=#fefefe
| 144781 ||  || — || April 21, 2004 || Socorro || LINEAR || FLO || align=right | 1.1 km || 
|-id=782 bgcolor=#d6d6d6
| 144782 ||  || — || April 21, 2004 || Socorro || LINEAR || — || align=right | 4.9 km || 
|-id=783 bgcolor=#d6d6d6
| 144783 ||  || — || April 21, 2004 || Socorro || LINEAR || — || align=right | 3.7 km || 
|-id=784 bgcolor=#E9E9E9
| 144784 ||  || — || April 21, 2004 || Socorro || LINEAR || — || align=right | 2.7 km || 
|-id=785 bgcolor=#E9E9E9
| 144785 ||  || — || April 22, 2004 || Reedy Creek || J. Broughton || MIT || align=right | 3.5 km || 
|-id=786 bgcolor=#d6d6d6
| 144786 ||  || — || April 20, 2004 || Socorro || LINEAR || — || align=right | 4.0 km || 
|-id=787 bgcolor=#E9E9E9
| 144787 ||  || — || April 23, 2004 || Catalina || CSS || — || align=right | 5.0 km || 
|-id=788 bgcolor=#d6d6d6
| 144788 ||  || — || April 20, 2004 || Socorro || LINEAR || — || align=right | 4.7 km || 
|-id=789 bgcolor=#E9E9E9
| 144789 ||  || — || April 20, 2004 || Socorro || LINEAR || WIT || align=right | 1.6 km || 
|-id=790 bgcolor=#d6d6d6
| 144790 ||  || — || April 21, 2004 || Socorro || LINEAR || — || align=right | 5.4 km || 
|-id=791 bgcolor=#fefefe
| 144791 ||  || — || April 21, 2004 || Socorro || LINEAR || — || align=right | 1.5 km || 
|-id=792 bgcolor=#d6d6d6
| 144792 ||  || — || April 21, 2004 || Siding Spring || SSS || EUP || align=right | 7.3 km || 
|-id=793 bgcolor=#E9E9E9
| 144793 ||  || — || April 22, 2004 || Catalina || CSS || — || align=right | 3.6 km || 
|-id=794 bgcolor=#d6d6d6
| 144794 ||  || — || April 22, 2004 || Catalina || CSS || — || align=right | 5.5 km || 
|-id=795 bgcolor=#E9E9E9
| 144795 ||  || — || April 22, 2004 || Siding Spring || SSS || — || align=right | 5.4 km || 
|-id=796 bgcolor=#d6d6d6
| 144796 ||  || — || April 22, 2004 || Siding Spring || SSS || — || align=right | 3.3 km || 
|-id=797 bgcolor=#d6d6d6
| 144797 ||  || — || April 23, 2004 || Kitt Peak || Spacewatch || 7:4 || align=right | 6.4 km || 
|-id=798 bgcolor=#E9E9E9
| 144798 ||  || — || April 23, 2004 || Siding Spring || SSS || — || align=right | 3.6 km || 
|-id=799 bgcolor=#E9E9E9
| 144799 ||  || — || April 21, 2004 || Socorro || LINEAR || EUN || align=right | 2.5 km || 
|-id=800 bgcolor=#d6d6d6
| 144800 ||  || — || April 23, 2004 || Socorro || LINEAR || — || align=right | 5.0 km || 
|}

144801–144900 

|-bgcolor=#E9E9E9
| 144801 ||  || — || April 23, 2004 || Catalina || CSS || — || align=right | 1.8 km || 
|-id=802 bgcolor=#d6d6d6
| 144802 ||  || — || April 23, 2004 || Catalina || CSS || — || align=right | 7.1 km || 
|-id=803 bgcolor=#d6d6d6
| 144803 ||  || — || April 25, 2004 || Anderson Mesa || LONEOS || — || align=right | 8.7 km || 
|-id=804 bgcolor=#E9E9E9
| 144804 ||  || — || April 24, 2004 || Kitt Peak || Spacewatch || — || align=right | 2.7 km || 
|-id=805 bgcolor=#d6d6d6
| 144805 ||  || — || April 24, 2004 || Kitt Peak || Spacewatch || — || align=right | 6.9 km || 
|-id=806 bgcolor=#d6d6d6
| 144806 ||  || — || April 25, 2004 || Socorro || LINEAR || — || align=right | 5.5 km || 
|-id=807 bgcolor=#E9E9E9
| 144807 ||  || — || April 16, 2004 || Palomar || NEAT || — || align=right | 1.9 km || 
|-id=808 bgcolor=#E9E9E9
| 144808 ||  || — || April 25, 2004 || Haleakala || NEAT || MIT || align=right | 4.4 km || 
|-id=809 bgcolor=#d6d6d6
| 144809 ||  || — || April 28, 2004 || Kitt Peak || Spacewatch || — || align=right | 4.1 km || 
|-id=810 bgcolor=#d6d6d6
| 144810 ||  || — || April 28, 2004 || Kitt Peak || Spacewatch || — || align=right | 5.7 km || 
|-id=811 bgcolor=#E9E9E9
| 144811 ||  || — || April 29, 2004 || Haleakala || NEAT || — || align=right | 2.8 km || 
|-id=812 bgcolor=#d6d6d6
| 144812 || 2004 JX || — || May 10, 2004 || Desert Eagle || W. K. Y. Yeung || EOS || align=right | 4.4 km || 
|-id=813 bgcolor=#d6d6d6
| 144813 ||  || — || May 10, 2004 || Reedy Creek || J. Broughton || — || align=right | 4.8 km || 
|-id=814 bgcolor=#d6d6d6
| 144814 ||  || — || May 12, 2004 || Desert Eagle || W. K. Y. Yeung || — || align=right | 4.1 km || 
|-id=815 bgcolor=#d6d6d6
| 144815 ||  || — || May 8, 2004 || Palomar || NEAT || — || align=right | 3.6 km || 
|-id=816 bgcolor=#E9E9E9
| 144816 ||  || — || May 10, 2004 || Catalina || CSS || — || align=right | 4.4 km || 
|-id=817 bgcolor=#d6d6d6
| 144817 ||  || — || May 12, 2004 || Reedy Creek || J. Broughton || — || align=right | 4.2 km || 
|-id=818 bgcolor=#d6d6d6
| 144818 ||  || — || May 12, 2004 || Reedy Creek || J. Broughton || VER || align=right | 4.9 km || 
|-id=819 bgcolor=#d6d6d6
| 144819 ||  || — || May 12, 2004 || Palomar || NEAT || EOS || align=right | 4.2 km || 
|-id=820 bgcolor=#E9E9E9
| 144820 ||  || — || May 10, 2004 || Palomar || NEAT || — || align=right | 4.5 km || 
|-id=821 bgcolor=#fefefe
| 144821 ||  || — || May 12, 2004 || Socorro || LINEAR || — || align=right | 4.7 km || 
|-id=822 bgcolor=#d6d6d6
| 144822 ||  || — || May 13, 2004 || Palomar || NEAT || — || align=right | 6.0 km || 
|-id=823 bgcolor=#d6d6d6
| 144823 ||  || — || May 9, 2004 || Kitt Peak || Spacewatch || THM || align=right | 3.8 km || 
|-id=824 bgcolor=#d6d6d6
| 144824 ||  || — || May 9, 2004 || Palomar || NEAT || — || align=right | 5.7 km || 
|-id=825 bgcolor=#d6d6d6
| 144825 ||  || — || May 9, 2004 || Haleakala || NEAT || — || align=right | 5.3 km || 
|-id=826 bgcolor=#fefefe
| 144826 ||  || — || May 10, 2004 || Palomar || NEAT || NYS || align=right | 2.5 km || 
|-id=827 bgcolor=#d6d6d6
| 144827 ||  || — || May 11, 2004 || Anderson Mesa || LONEOS || — || align=right | 4.3 km || 
|-id=828 bgcolor=#E9E9E9
| 144828 ||  || — || May 11, 2004 || Anderson Mesa || LONEOS || DOR || align=right | 3.9 km || 
|-id=829 bgcolor=#E9E9E9
| 144829 ||  || — || May 11, 2004 || Anderson Mesa || LONEOS || — || align=right | 1.6 km || 
|-id=830 bgcolor=#d6d6d6
| 144830 ||  || — || May 12, 2004 || Siding Spring || SSS || — || align=right | 4.3 km || 
|-id=831 bgcolor=#d6d6d6
| 144831 ||  || — || May 9, 2004 || Kitt Peak || Spacewatch || — || align=right | 3.8 km || 
|-id=832 bgcolor=#d6d6d6
| 144832 ||  || — || May 13, 2004 || Kitt Peak || Spacewatch || — || align=right | 5.2 km || 
|-id=833 bgcolor=#d6d6d6
| 144833 ||  || — || May 15, 2004 || Socorro || LINEAR || — || align=right | 3.8 km || 
|-id=834 bgcolor=#E9E9E9
| 144834 ||  || — || May 15, 2004 || Socorro || LINEAR || ADE || align=right | 4.7 km || 
|-id=835 bgcolor=#d6d6d6
| 144835 ||  || — || May 15, 2004 || Socorro || LINEAR || — || align=right | 4.2 km || 
|-id=836 bgcolor=#E9E9E9
| 144836 ||  || — || May 13, 2004 || Kitt Peak || Spacewatch || — || align=right | 5.2 km || 
|-id=837 bgcolor=#d6d6d6
| 144837 ||  || — || May 15, 2004 || Socorro || LINEAR || — || align=right | 5.0 km || 
|-id=838 bgcolor=#fefefe
| 144838 ||  || — || May 15, 2004 || Socorro || LINEAR || NYS || align=right | 1.4 km || 
|-id=839 bgcolor=#E9E9E9
| 144839 ||  || — || May 15, 2004 || Socorro || LINEAR || — || align=right | 3.3 km || 
|-id=840 bgcolor=#C2FFFF
| 144840 ||  || — || May 13, 2004 || Palomar || NEAT || L4 || align=right | 12 km || 
|-id=841 bgcolor=#d6d6d6
| 144841 ||  || — || May 13, 2004 || Kitt Peak || Spacewatch || EOS || align=right | 5.7 km || 
|-id=842 bgcolor=#d6d6d6
| 144842 ||  || — || May 13, 2004 || Palomar || NEAT || HYG || align=right | 7.0 km || 
|-id=843 bgcolor=#E9E9E9
| 144843 ||  || — || May 14, 2004 || Kitt Peak || Spacewatch || — || align=right | 2.1 km || 
|-id=844 bgcolor=#fefefe
| 144844 ||  || — || May 15, 2004 || Socorro || LINEAR || — || align=right | 1.4 km || 
|-id=845 bgcolor=#d6d6d6
| 144845 ||  || — || May 15, 2004 || Socorro || LINEAR || THM || align=right | 3.1 km || 
|-id=846 bgcolor=#d6d6d6
| 144846 ||  || — || May 13, 2004 || Kitt Peak || Spacewatch || KOR || align=right | 1.7 km || 
|-id=847 bgcolor=#d6d6d6
| 144847 ||  || — || May 13, 2004 || Kitt Peak || Spacewatch || HYG || align=right | 3.2 km || 
|-id=848 bgcolor=#d6d6d6
| 144848 ||  || — || May 16, 2004 || Kitt Peak || Spacewatch || — || align=right | 4.3 km || 
|-id=849 bgcolor=#d6d6d6
| 144849 ||  || — || May 16, 2004 || Socorro || LINEAR || EOS || align=right | 3.5 km || 
|-id=850 bgcolor=#E9E9E9
| 144850 ||  || — || May 17, 2004 || Socorro || LINEAR || — || align=right | 2.3 km || 
|-id=851 bgcolor=#d6d6d6
| 144851 ||  || — || May 20, 2004 || Needville || Needville Obs. || 3:2 || align=right | 7.1 km || 
|-id=852 bgcolor=#d6d6d6
| 144852 ||  || — || May 17, 2004 || Socorro || LINEAR || EOS || align=right | 4.5 km || 
|-id=853 bgcolor=#d6d6d6
| 144853 ||  || — || May 18, 2004 || Socorro || LINEAR || — || align=right | 4.4 km || 
|-id=854 bgcolor=#E9E9E9
| 144854 ||  || — || May 19, 2004 || Socorro || LINEAR || — || align=right | 5.2 km || 
|-id=855 bgcolor=#d6d6d6
| 144855 ||  || — || May 19, 2004 || Siding Spring || SSS || — || align=right | 4.2 km || 
|-id=856 bgcolor=#E9E9E9
| 144856 ||  || — || May 20, 2004 || Kitt Peak || Spacewatch || — || align=right | 1.9 km || 
|-id=857 bgcolor=#E9E9E9
| 144857 ||  || — || June 11, 2004 || Socorro || LINEAR || — || align=right | 2.1 km || 
|-id=858 bgcolor=#E9E9E9
| 144858 ||  || — || June 13, 2004 || Socorro || LINEAR || — || align=right | 4.8 km || 
|-id=859 bgcolor=#fefefe
| 144859 ||  || — || June 8, 2004 || Kitt Peak || Spacewatch || MAS || align=right | 1.3 km || 
|-id=860 bgcolor=#E9E9E9
| 144860 ||  || — || June 11, 2004 || Kitt Peak || Spacewatch || — || align=right | 2.5 km || 
|-id=861 bgcolor=#FFC2E0
| 144861 ||  || — || June 14, 2004 || Palomar || NEAT || APO +1km || align=right | 2.9 km || 
|-id=862 bgcolor=#d6d6d6
| 144862 ||  || — || June 11, 2004 || Socorro || LINEAR || — || align=right | 6.6 km || 
|-id=863 bgcolor=#d6d6d6
| 144863 ||  || — || June 11, 2004 || Socorro || LINEAR || — || align=right | 3.2 km || 
|-id=864 bgcolor=#E9E9E9
| 144864 ||  || — || June 11, 2004 || Socorro || LINEAR || ADE || align=right | 4.4 km || 
|-id=865 bgcolor=#d6d6d6
| 144865 ||  || — || June 11, 2004 || Socorro || LINEAR || URS || align=right | 4.3 km || 
|-id=866 bgcolor=#d6d6d6
| 144866 ||  || — || June 14, 2004 || Socorro || LINEAR || Tj (2.95) || align=right | 7.9 km || 
|-id=867 bgcolor=#E9E9E9
| 144867 ||  || — || June 14, 2004 || Socorro || LINEAR || — || align=right | 1.8 km || 
|-id=868 bgcolor=#d6d6d6
| 144868 ||  || — || June 14, 2004 || Kitt Peak || Spacewatch || — || align=right | 3.4 km || 
|-id=869 bgcolor=#E9E9E9
| 144869 || 2004 MQ || — || June 16, 2004 || Socorro || LINEAR || — || align=right | 3.2 km || 
|-id=870 bgcolor=#B88A00
| 144870 ||  || — || June 29, 2004 || Siding Spring || SSS || 7:4*unusual || align=right | 6.9 km || 
|-id=871 bgcolor=#d6d6d6
| 144871 ||  || — || July 9, 2004 || Socorro || LINEAR || — || align=right | 3.7 km || 
|-id=872 bgcolor=#d6d6d6
| 144872 ||  || — || July 11, 2004 || Socorro || LINEAR || — || align=right | 3.3 km || 
|-id=873 bgcolor=#d6d6d6
| 144873 ||  || — || July 14, 2004 || Socorro || LINEAR || — || align=right | 4.3 km || 
|-id=874 bgcolor=#fefefe
| 144874 ||  || — || July 9, 2004 || Anderson Mesa || LONEOS || MAS || align=right | 1.6 km || 
|-id=875 bgcolor=#E9E9E9
| 144875 || 2004 OX || — || July 16, 2004 || Reedy Creek || J. Broughton || — || align=right | 1.7 km || 
|-id=876 bgcolor=#d6d6d6
| 144876 ||  || — || July 16, 2004 || Socorro || LINEAR || — || align=right | 3.5 km || 
|-id=877 bgcolor=#d6d6d6
| 144877 ||  || — || July 17, 2004 || Socorro || LINEAR || EOS || align=right | 3.7 km || 
|-id=878 bgcolor=#d6d6d6
| 144878 ||  || — || September 6, 2004 || Goodricke-Pigott || Goodricke-Pigott Obs. || — || align=right | 5.6 km || 
|-id=879 bgcolor=#E9E9E9
| 144879 ||  || — || September 7, 2004 || Kitt Peak || Spacewatch || — || align=right | 3.8 km || 
|-id=880 bgcolor=#d6d6d6
| 144880 ||  || — || September 8, 2004 || Socorro || LINEAR || HYG || align=right | 5.4 km || 
|-id=881 bgcolor=#d6d6d6
| 144881 ||  || — || September 8, 2004 || Socorro || LINEAR || slow || align=right | 6.1 km || 
|-id=882 bgcolor=#d6d6d6
| 144882 ||  || — || September 8, 2004 || Palomar || NEAT || — || align=right | 5.5 km || 
|-id=883 bgcolor=#fefefe
| 144883 ||  || — || September 11, 2004 || Socorro || LINEAR || H || align=right data-sort-value="0.87" | 870 m || 
|-id=884 bgcolor=#E9E9E9
| 144884 ||  || — || September 7, 2004 || Socorro || LINEAR || — || align=right | 4.3 km || 
|-id=885 bgcolor=#d6d6d6
| 144885 ||  || — || September 7, 2004 || Socorro || LINEAR || 7:4 || align=right | 6.8 km || 
|-id=886 bgcolor=#d6d6d6
| 144886 ||  || — || September 8, 2004 || Socorro || LINEAR || KOR || align=right | 2.5 km || 
|-id=887 bgcolor=#d6d6d6
| 144887 ||  || — || September 9, 2004 || Uccle || P. De Cat, E. W. Elst || — || align=right | 4.8 km || 
|-id=888 bgcolor=#d6d6d6
| 144888 ||  || — || September 10, 2004 || Socorro || LINEAR || EOS || align=right | 4.2 km || 
|-id=889 bgcolor=#d6d6d6
| 144889 ||  || — || September 11, 2004 || Socorro || LINEAR || ALA || align=right | 7.1 km || 
|-id=890 bgcolor=#E9E9E9
| 144890 ||  || — || September 15, 2004 || 7300 Observatory || W. K. Y. Yeung || — || align=right | 2.4 km || 
|-id=891 bgcolor=#fefefe
| 144891 ||  || — || September 14, 2004 || Socorro || LINEAR || H || align=right data-sort-value="0.91" | 910 m || 
|-id=892 bgcolor=#E9E9E9
| 144892 ||  || — || September 17, 2004 || Kitt Peak || Spacewatch || — || align=right | 4.0 km || 
|-id=893 bgcolor=#fefefe
| 144893 ||  || — || September 17, 2004 || Socorro || LINEAR || — || align=right | 1.2 km || 
|-id=894 bgcolor=#d6d6d6
| 144894 ||  || — || September 17, 2004 || Kitt Peak || Spacewatch || 3:2 || align=right | 9.8 km || 
|-id=895 bgcolor=#E9E9E9
| 144895 ||  || — || October 5, 2004 || Palomar || NEAT || GEF || align=right | 2.1 km || 
|-id=896 bgcolor=#fefefe
| 144896 ||  || — || October 10, 2004 || Kitt Peak || Spacewatch || — || align=right | 1.1 km || 
|-id=897 bgcolor=#C2E0FF
| 144897 ||  || — || October 20, 2004 || Apache Point || A. C. Becker, A. W. Puckett, J. Kubica || cubewano (hot) || align=right | 571 km || 
|-id=898 bgcolor=#FFC2E0
| 144898 ||  || — || November 7, 2004 || Socorro || LINEAR || APOPHAfast || align=right data-sort-value="0.61" | 610 m || 
|-id=899 bgcolor=#E9E9E9
| 144899 ||  || — || November 3, 2004 || Kitt Peak || Spacewatch || KRM || align=right | 4.0 km || 
|-id=900 bgcolor=#FFC2E0
| 144900 ||  || — || November 13, 2004 || Catalina || CSS || ATEPHAcritical || align=right data-sort-value="0.78" | 780 m || 
|}

144901–145000 

|-bgcolor=#FFC2E0
| 144901 ||  || — || November 19, 2004 || Socorro || LINEAR || APO +1km || align=right | 2.2 km || 
|-id=902 bgcolor=#fefefe
| 144902 ||  || — || December 8, 2004 || Socorro || LINEAR || V || align=right | 1.2 km || 
|-id=903 bgcolor=#E9E9E9
| 144903 ||  || — || December 8, 2004 || Socorro || LINEAR || — || align=right | 5.1 km || 
|-id=904 bgcolor=#E9E9E9
| 144904 ||  || — || December 9, 2004 || Kitt Peak || Spacewatch || NEM || align=right | 3.3 km || 
|-id=905 bgcolor=#E9E9E9
| 144905 ||  || — || December 10, 2004 || Socorro || LINEAR || — || align=right | 4.1 km || 
|-id=906 bgcolor=#E9E9E9
| 144906 ||  || — || December 14, 2004 || Socorro || LINEAR || — || align=right | 1.6 km || 
|-id=907 bgcolor=#d6d6d6
| 144907 Whitehorne ||  ||  || December 16, 2004 || Jarnac || T. Glinos, D. H. Levy, W. Levy || — || align=right | 2.9 km || 
|-id=908 bgcolor=#C7FF8F
| 144908 ||  || — || December 18, 2004 || Siding Spring || SSS || damocloidunusualcritical || align=right | 12 km || 
|-id=909 bgcolor=#d6d6d6
| 144909 ||  || — || December 16, 2004 || Socorro || LINEAR || — || align=right | 3.9 km || 
|-id=910 bgcolor=#d6d6d6
| 144910 ||  || — || January 6, 2005 || Socorro || LINEAR || KOR || align=right | 2.5 km || 
|-id=911 bgcolor=#fefefe
| 144911 ||  || — || January 15, 2005 || Socorro || LINEAR || H || align=right | 1.3 km || 
|-id=912 bgcolor=#d6d6d6
| 144912 ||  || — || January 11, 2005 || Socorro || LINEAR || — || align=right | 4.3 km || 
|-id=913 bgcolor=#d6d6d6
| 144913 ||  || — || January 13, 2005 || Kitt Peak || Spacewatch || — || align=right | 3.1 km || 
|-id=914 bgcolor=#d6d6d6
| 144914 ||  || — || January 15, 2005 || Socorro || LINEAR || KOR || align=right | 2.3 km || 
|-id=915 bgcolor=#fefefe
| 144915 ||  || — || January 7, 2005 || Catalina || CSS || PHO || align=right | 2.1 km || 
|-id=916 bgcolor=#d6d6d6
| 144916 ||  || — || January 15, 2005 || Kitt Peak || Spacewatch || — || align=right | 4.1 km || 
|-id=917 bgcolor=#fefefe
| 144917 ||  || — || January 16, 2005 || Socorro || LINEAR || — || align=right | 1.4 km || 
|-id=918 bgcolor=#fefefe
| 144918 ||  || — || January 19, 2005 || Kitt Peak || Spacewatch || — || align=right | 1.4 km || 
|-id=919 bgcolor=#fefefe
| 144919 ||  || — || January 16, 2005 || Socorro || LINEAR || H || align=right | 1.5 km || 
|-id=920 bgcolor=#fefefe
| 144920 ||  || — || January 17, 2005 || Catalina || CSS || H || align=right data-sort-value="0.96" | 960 m || 
|-id=921 bgcolor=#fefefe
| 144921 ||  || — || February 4, 2005 || Palomar || NEAT || — || align=right | 1.6 km || 
|-id=922 bgcolor=#FFC2E0
| 144922 ||  || — || February 3, 2005 || Socorro || LINEAR || AMO +1km || align=right | 1.3 km || 
|-id=923 bgcolor=#fefefe
| 144923 ||  || — || February 2, 2005 || Catalina || CSS || — || align=right | 1.7 km || 
|-id=924 bgcolor=#E9E9E9
| 144924 ||  || — || February 2, 2005 || Socorro || LINEAR || — || align=right | 7.9 km || 
|-id=925 bgcolor=#fefefe
| 144925 ||  || — || February 2, 2005 || Socorro || LINEAR || FLO || align=right | 1.1 km || 
|-id=926 bgcolor=#fefefe
| 144926 ||  || — || February 2, 2005 || Kitt Peak || Spacewatch || — || align=right | 1.5 km || 
|-id=927 bgcolor=#fefefe
| 144927 ||  || — || February 2, 2005 || Kitt Peak || Spacewatch || NYS || align=right data-sort-value="0.90" | 900 m || 
|-id=928 bgcolor=#fefefe
| 144928 ||  || — || February 2, 2005 || Kitt Peak || Spacewatch || NYS || align=right data-sort-value="0.99" | 990 m || 
|-id=929 bgcolor=#fefefe
| 144929 ||  || — || February 9, 2005 || Anderson Mesa || LONEOS || H || align=right | 1.3 km || 
|-id=930 bgcolor=#fefefe
| 144930 ||  || — || February 2, 2005 || Socorro || LINEAR || MAS || align=right | 1.5 km || 
|-id=931 bgcolor=#fefefe
| 144931 ||  || — || March 2, 2005 || Catalina || CSS || H || align=right | 1.1 km || 
|-id=932 bgcolor=#fefefe
| 144932 ||  || — || March 1, 2005 || Kitt Peak || Spacewatch || NYS || align=right | 1.1 km || 
|-id=933 bgcolor=#fefefe
| 144933 ||  || — || March 1, 2005 || Kitt Peak || Spacewatch || — || align=right | 1.4 km || 
|-id=934 bgcolor=#fefefe
| 144934 ||  || — || March 2, 2005 || Kitt Peak || Spacewatch || MAS || align=right | 1.1 km || 
|-id=935 bgcolor=#fefefe
| 144935 ||  || — || March 2, 2005 || Kitt Peak || Spacewatch || V || align=right | 1.1 km || 
|-id=936 bgcolor=#fefefe
| 144936 ||  || — || March 3, 2005 || Kitt Peak || Spacewatch || NYS || align=right data-sort-value="0.92" | 920 m || 
|-id=937 bgcolor=#fefefe
| 144937 ||  || — || March 3, 2005 || Kitt Peak || Spacewatch || — || align=right | 1.3 km || 
|-id=938 bgcolor=#fefefe
| 144938 ||  || — || March 3, 2005 || Kitt Peak || Spacewatch || — || align=right | 1.3 km || 
|-id=939 bgcolor=#fefefe
| 144939 ||  || — || March 3, 2005 || Kitt Peak || Spacewatch || FLO || align=right data-sort-value="0.97" | 970 m || 
|-id=940 bgcolor=#E9E9E9
| 144940 ||  || — || March 3, 2005 || Kitt Peak || Spacewatch || — || align=right | 2.6 km || 
|-id=941 bgcolor=#fefefe
| 144941 ||  || — || March 3, 2005 || Catalina || CSS || — || align=right | 1.7 km || 
|-id=942 bgcolor=#fefefe
| 144942 ||  || — || March 3, 2005 || Goodricke-Pigott || R. A. Tucker || NYS || align=right | 1.2 km || 
|-id=943 bgcolor=#fefefe
| 144943 ||  || — || March 3, 2005 || Catalina || CSS || — || align=right | 3.9 km || 
|-id=944 bgcolor=#fefefe
| 144944 ||  || — || March 3, 2005 || Catalina || CSS || MAS || align=right | 1.1 km || 
|-id=945 bgcolor=#fefefe
| 144945 ||  || — || March 3, 2005 || Catalina || CSS || H || align=right data-sort-value="0.95" | 950 m || 
|-id=946 bgcolor=#fefefe
| 144946 ||  || — || March 1, 2005 || Kitt Peak || Spacewatch || — || align=right | 1.6 km || 
|-id=947 bgcolor=#d6d6d6
| 144947 ||  || — || March 3, 2005 || Kitt Peak || Spacewatch || — || align=right | 3.0 km || 
|-id=948 bgcolor=#E9E9E9
| 144948 ||  || — || March 3, 2005 || Catalina || CSS || INO || align=right | 1.9 km || 
|-id=949 bgcolor=#fefefe
| 144949 ||  || — || March 3, 2005 || Kitt Peak || Spacewatch || NYS || align=right | 1.0 km || 
|-id=950 bgcolor=#fefefe
| 144950 ||  || — || March 4, 2005 || Catalina || CSS || V || align=right | 1.0 km || 
|-id=951 bgcolor=#fefefe
| 144951 ||  || — || March 4, 2005 || Catalina || CSS || — || align=right | 2.4 km || 
|-id=952 bgcolor=#fefefe
| 144952 ||  || — || March 4, 2005 || Kitt Peak || Spacewatch || FLO || align=right | 1.2 km || 
|-id=953 bgcolor=#fefefe
| 144953 ||  || — || March 1, 2005 || Kitt Peak || Spacewatch || V || align=right | 1.2 km || 
|-id=954 bgcolor=#fefefe
| 144954 ||  || — || March 3, 2005 || Kitt Peak || Spacewatch || NYS || align=right | 1.2 km || 
|-id=955 bgcolor=#E9E9E9
| 144955 ||  || — || March 3, 2005 || Kitt Peak || Spacewatch || — || align=right | 4.8 km || 
|-id=956 bgcolor=#fefefe
| 144956 ||  || — || March 3, 2005 || Kitt Peak || Spacewatch || — || align=right | 1.3 km || 
|-id=957 bgcolor=#fefefe
| 144957 ||  || — || March 3, 2005 || Catalina || CSS || NYS || align=right | 1.0 km || 
|-id=958 bgcolor=#fefefe
| 144958 ||  || — || March 3, 2005 || Catalina || CSS || V || align=right | 1.1 km || 
|-id=959 bgcolor=#fefefe
| 144959 ||  || — || March 4, 2005 || Kitt Peak || Spacewatch || NYS || align=right data-sort-value="0.84" | 840 m || 
|-id=960 bgcolor=#fefefe
| 144960 ||  || — || March 3, 2005 || Catalina || CSS || — || align=right | 1.3 km || 
|-id=961 bgcolor=#fefefe
| 144961 ||  || — || March 3, 2005 || Catalina || CSS || V || align=right | 1.0 km || 
|-id=962 bgcolor=#fefefe
| 144962 ||  || — || March 3, 2005 || Catalina || CSS || NYS || align=right | 1.1 km || 
|-id=963 bgcolor=#fefefe
| 144963 ||  || — || March 3, 2005 || Socorro || LINEAR || — || align=right | 1.6 km || 
|-id=964 bgcolor=#fefefe
| 144964 ||  || — || March 3, 2005 || Catalina || CSS || V || align=right | 1.1 km || 
|-id=965 bgcolor=#fefefe
| 144965 ||  || — || March 4, 2005 || Socorro || LINEAR || NYS || align=right | 1.3 km || 
|-id=966 bgcolor=#fefefe
| 144966 ||  || — || March 8, 2005 || Anderson Mesa || LONEOS || — || align=right | 1.7 km || 
|-id=967 bgcolor=#fefefe
| 144967 ||  || — || March 8, 2005 || Socorro || LINEAR || V || align=right | 1.9 km || 
|-id=968 bgcolor=#d6d6d6
| 144968 ||  || — || March 8, 2005 || Socorro || LINEAR || EUP || align=right | 6.9 km || 
|-id=969 bgcolor=#fefefe
| 144969 ||  || — || March 1, 2005 || Catalina || CSS || H || align=right | 1.1 km || 
|-id=970 bgcolor=#fefefe
| 144970 ||  || — || March 3, 2005 || Catalina || CSS || — || align=right | 1.6 km || 
|-id=971 bgcolor=#fefefe
| 144971 ||  || — || March 4, 2005 || Catalina || CSS || FLO || align=right | 1.2 km || 
|-id=972 bgcolor=#fefefe
| 144972 ||  || — || March 7, 2005 || Goodricke-Pigott || R. A. Tucker || — || align=right | 1.4 km || 
|-id=973 bgcolor=#fefefe
| 144973 ||  || — || March 8, 2005 || Anderson Mesa || LONEOS || FLO || align=right | 1.1 km || 
|-id=974 bgcolor=#fefefe
| 144974 ||  || — || March 8, 2005 || Mount Lemmon || Mount Lemmon Survey || Vslow || align=right data-sort-value="0.93" | 930 m || 
|-id=975 bgcolor=#fefefe
| 144975 ||  || — || March 8, 2005 || Mount Lemmon || Mount Lemmon Survey || NYS || align=right | 1.3 km || 
|-id=976 bgcolor=#fefefe
| 144976 ||  || — || March 8, 2005 || Mount Lemmon || Mount Lemmon Survey || — || align=right | 1.4 km || 
|-id=977 bgcolor=#fefefe
| 144977 ||  || — || March 9, 2005 || Kitt Peak || Spacewatch || FLOfast || align=right data-sort-value="0.86" | 860 m || 
|-id=978 bgcolor=#fefefe
| 144978 ||  || — || March 9, 2005 || Catalina || CSS || H || align=right | 1.1 km || 
|-id=979 bgcolor=#fefefe
| 144979 ||  || — || March 9, 2005 || Mount Lemmon || Mount Lemmon Survey || — || align=right | 1.7 km || 
|-id=980 bgcolor=#E9E9E9
| 144980 ||  || — || March 9, 2005 || Mount Lemmon || Mount Lemmon Survey || MIS || align=right | 3.8 km || 
|-id=981 bgcolor=#fefefe
| 144981 ||  || — || March 10, 2005 || Catalina || CSS || NYS || align=right | 1.0 km || 
|-id=982 bgcolor=#E9E9E9
| 144982 ||  || — || March 10, 2005 || Catalina || CSS || — || align=right | 1.7 km || 
|-id=983 bgcolor=#fefefe
| 144983 ||  || — || March 10, 2005 || Kitt Peak || Spacewatch || — || align=right data-sort-value="0.91" | 910 m || 
|-id=984 bgcolor=#fefefe
| 144984 ||  || — || March 10, 2005 || Kitt Peak || Spacewatch || — || align=right | 1.1 km || 
|-id=985 bgcolor=#E9E9E9
| 144985 ||  || — || March 10, 2005 || Kitt Peak || Spacewatch || — || align=right | 1.5 km || 
|-id=986 bgcolor=#fefefe
| 144986 ||  || — || March 8, 2005 || Mount Lemmon || Mount Lemmon Survey || NYS || align=right data-sort-value="0.95" | 950 m || 
|-id=987 bgcolor=#fefefe
| 144987 ||  || — || March 8, 2005 || Mount Lemmon || Mount Lemmon Survey || FLO || align=right data-sort-value="0.93" | 930 m || 
|-id=988 bgcolor=#fefefe
| 144988 ||  || — || March 10, 2005 || Mount Lemmon || Mount Lemmon Survey || NYS || align=right | 1.0 km || 
|-id=989 bgcolor=#fefefe
| 144989 ||  || — || March 7, 2005 || Socorro || LINEAR || — || align=right | 1.6 km || 
|-id=990 bgcolor=#fefefe
| 144990 ||  || — || March 9, 2005 || Kitt Peak || Spacewatch || NYS || align=right data-sort-value="0.84" | 840 m || 
|-id=991 bgcolor=#E9E9E9
| 144991 ||  || — || March 9, 2005 || Anderson Mesa || LONEOS || — || align=right | 4.9 km || 
|-id=992 bgcolor=#fefefe
| 144992 ||  || — || March 9, 2005 || Anderson Mesa || LONEOS || — || align=right | 1.2 km || 
|-id=993 bgcolor=#fefefe
| 144993 ||  || — || March 9, 2005 || Siding Spring || SSS || — || align=right | 1.3 km || 
|-id=994 bgcolor=#fefefe
| 144994 ||  || — || March 10, 2005 || Catalina || CSS || FLO || align=right | 1.3 km || 
|-id=995 bgcolor=#fefefe
| 144995 ||  || — || March 10, 2005 || Mount Lemmon || Mount Lemmon Survey || — || align=right | 1.3 km || 
|-id=996 bgcolor=#fefefe
| 144996 ||  || — || March 10, 2005 || Mount Lemmon || Mount Lemmon Survey || — || align=right | 1.0 km || 
|-id=997 bgcolor=#fefefe
| 144997 ||  || — || March 11, 2005 || Mount Lemmon || Mount Lemmon Survey || — || align=right | 1.3 km || 
|-id=998 bgcolor=#fefefe
| 144998 ||  || — || March 11, 2005 || Mount Lemmon || Mount Lemmon Survey || — || align=right | 1.1 km || 
|-id=999 bgcolor=#E9E9E9
| 144999 ||  || — || March 11, 2005 || Kitt Peak || Spacewatch || DOR || align=right | 4.2 km || 
|-id=000 bgcolor=#fefefe
| 145000 ||  || — || March 12, 2005 || Anderson Mesa || LONEOS || — || align=right | 1.4 km || 
|}

References

External links 
 Discovery Circumstances: Numbered Minor Planets (140001)–(145000) (IAU Minor Planet Center)

0144